= Kingston upon Hull West =

Parliamentary constituency in the United Kingdom, 1955–1997

- Former borough constituency for the House of Commons
- Kingston upon Hull West in Humberside, showing boundaries used from 1983–1997
- Major settlements: Kingston upon Hull

1955–1997
- Seats: One
- Created from: Hull Central and Haltemprice
- Replaced by: Hull West and Hessle

1885–1918
- Seats: One
- Type of constituency: Borough constituency
- Created from: Kingston upon Hull
- Replaced by: Hull North West and Hull South West

Kingston upon Hull West was a borough constituency in Kingston upon Hull which returned one Member of Parliament (MP) to the House of Commons of the Parliament of the United Kingdom from 1885 until it was abolished for the 1918 general election.

It was recreated for the 1955 general election and abolished again for the 1997 general election. It was then replaced by the new Hull West and Hessle constituency.

== Boundaries ==
1885–1918: The Municipal Borough of Kingston-upon-Hull wards of Albert, Botanic, Coltman, Newington, and Park.

1955–1974: The County Borough of Kingston-upon-Hull wards of Albert, Coltman, North Newington, Pickering, St Andrew's, and South Newington.

1974–1983: The County Borough of Kingston-upon-Hull wards of Boothferry, Coltman, Derringham, Newington, Pickering, and St Andrew's.

1983–1997: The City of Hull wards of Boothferry, Derringham, Myton, Newington, Pickering, and St Andrew's.

== Members of Parliament ==
=== MPs 1885–1918 ===
Election	Member	Party
1885	Charles Wilson	Liberal
1906	Charles Wilson	Liberal
1907	Guy Wilson	Liberal
1918	Constituency abolished	

=== MPs 1955–1997 ===
Election	Member	Party
1955	Mark Hewitson	Labour
1964	James Johnson	Labour
1983	Stuart Randall	Labour
1997	Constituency abolished: see Hull West and Hessle	

== Elections ==
=== Elections in the 1880s ===
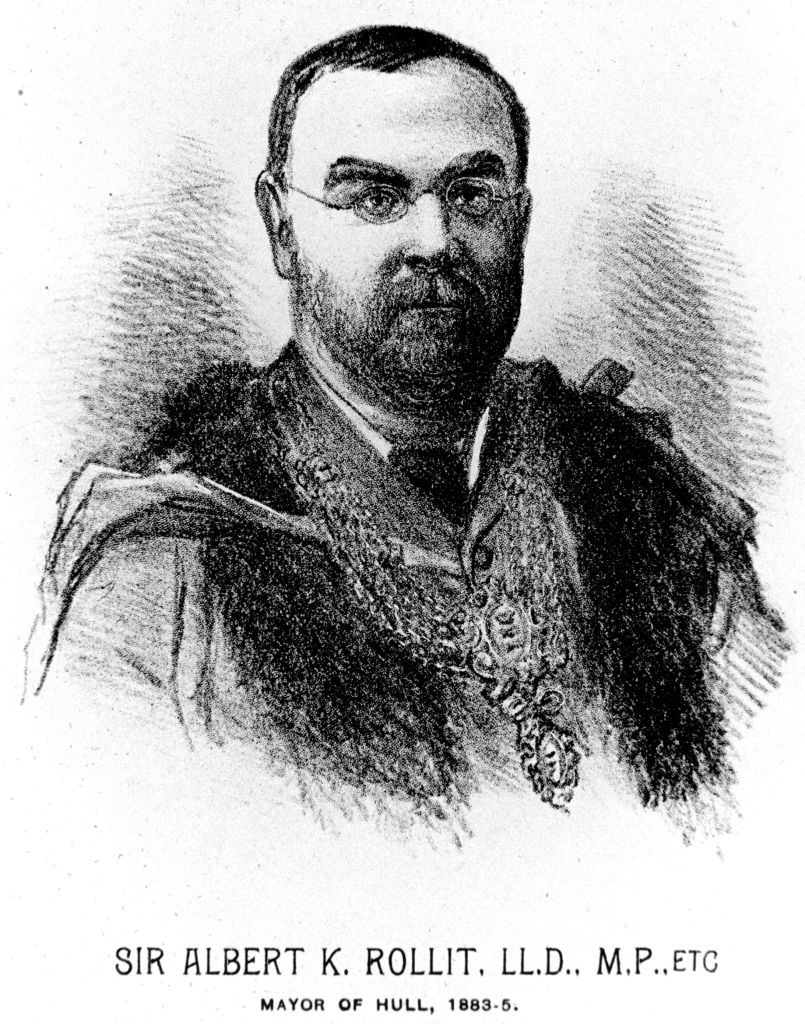
Rollit

General election 1885: Kingston upon Hull West
Party	Candidate	Votes	%	±%
Liberal	Charles Wilson	5,247	58.7	
Conservative	Albert Rollit	3,697	41.3	
Majority		1,550	17.4	
Turnout		8,944	77.7	
Registered electors		11,517		
Liberal win (new seat)				

Wilson

General election 1886: Kingston upon Hull West
Party	Candidate	Votes	%	±%
Liberal	Charles Wilson	4,623	60.3	+1.6
Conservative	Arthur Knocker Dibb	3,045	39.7	−1.6
Majority		1,578	20.6	+3.2
Turnout		7,668	66.6	−11.1
Registered electors		11,517		
Liberal hold		Swing	+1.6	

=== Elections in the 1890s ===
General election 1892: Kingston upon Hull West
Party	Candidate	Votes	%	±%
Liberal	Charles Wilson	6,283	64.2	+3.9
Liberal Unionist	Goldwin Smith	3,500	35.8	−3.9
Majority		2,783	28.4	+7.8
Turnout		9,783	70.2	+3.6
Registered electors		13,929		
Liberal hold		Swing	+3.9	

General election 1895: Kingston upon Hull West
Party	Candidate	Votes	%	±%
Liberal	Charles Wilson	6,637	82.6	+18.4
Ind. Labour Party	Tom McCarthy	1,400	17.4	New
Majority		5,237	65.2	+36.8
Turnout		8,037	55.4	−14.8
Registered electors		14,520		
Liberal hold		Swing		

=== Elections in the 1900s ===
General election 1900: Kingston upon Hull West
Party	Candidate	Votes	%	±%
Liberal	Charles Wilson	6,364	59.0	−23.6
Conservative	John Bouch Willows	4,419	41.0	New
Majority		1,945	18.0	−47.2
Turnout		10,783	64.3	+8.9
Registered electors		16,757		
Liberal hold		Swing	N/A	

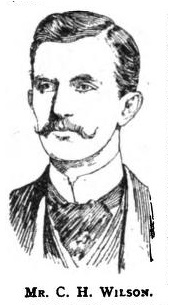

General election 1906: Kingston upon Hull West
Party	Candidate	Votes	%	±%
Liberal	Charles Wilson	8,652	57.5	−1.5
Liberal Unionist	John Sherburn	6,405	42.5	+1.5
Majority		2,247	15.0	−3.0
Turnout		15,057	74.6	+10.3
Registered electors		20,192		
Liberal hold		Swing	−1.5	

Bartley

1907 Kingston upon Hull West by-election
Party	Candidate	Votes	%	±%
Liberal	Guy Wilson	5,623	36.2	−21.3
Conservative	George Trout Bartley	5,382	34.7	−7.8
Labour	James Holmes	4,512	29.1	New
Majority		241	1.5	−13.5
Turnout		15,517	75.4	+0.8
Registered electors		20,583		
Liberal hold		Swing	−6.8	

=== Elections in the 1910s ===
General election January 1910: Kingston upon Hull West
Party	Candidate	Votes	%	±%
Liberal	Guy Wilson	10,005	54.7	−2.8
Liberal Unionist	John Sherburn	8,288	45.3	+2.8
Majority		1,717	9.4	−5.6
Turnout		18,293	80.9	+6.3
Registered electors		22,609		
Liberal hold		Swing	−2.8	

General election December 1910: Kingston upon Hull West
Party	Candidate	Votes	%	±%
Liberal	Guy Wilson	9,236	53.8	−0.9
Conservative	Lambert Ward	7,943	46.2	+0.9
Majority		1,293	7.6	−1.8
Turnout		17,179	76.0	−4.9
Registered electors		22,609		
Liberal hold		Swing	−0.9	

General election 1914–15:

Another general election was required to take place before the end of 1915. The political parties had been making preparations for an election to take place and by July 1914, the following candidates had been selected;

- Labour: Alfred Gould
- Liberal: Guy Wilson
- National Sailors' and Firemen's Union: John R. Bell
- Unionist: W. H. Grace

=== Elections in the 1950s ===
General election 1955: Kingston upon Hull West
Party	Candidate	Votes	%	±%
Labour	Mark Hewitson	25,785	56.00	
Conservative	Reginald Northam	20,262	44.00	
Majority		5,523	12.00	
Turnout		46,047	70.12	
Labour win (new seat)				

General election 1959: Kingston upon Hull West
Party	Candidate	Votes	%	±%
Labour	Mark Hewitson	25,446	52.51	
Conservative	Thomas H. F. Farrell	23,011	47.49	
Majority		2,435	5.02	
Turnout		48,457	75.60	
Labour hold		Swing		

=== Elections in the 1960s ===
General election 1964: Kingston upon Hull West
Party	Candidate	Votes	%	±%
Labour	James Johnson	24,855	56.90	
Conservative	John G. Bellak	18,825	43.10	
Majority		6,030	13.80	
Turnout		43,680	70.94	
Labour hold		Swing		

General election 1966: Kingston upon Hull West
Party	Candidate	Votes	%	±%
Labour	James Johnson	26,816	64.82	
Conservative	Giles Shaw	14,551	35.18	
Majority		12,265	29.64	
Turnout		41,367	70.42	
Labour hold		Swing		

=== Elections in the 1970s ===
General election 1970: Kingston upon Hull West
Party	Candidate	Votes	%	±%
Labour	James Johnson	24,050	62.33	
Conservative	Timothy Edward Forrow	14,537	37.67	
Majority		9,513	24.66	
Turnout		38,587	64.79	
Labour hold		Swing		

General election February 1974: Kingston upon Hull West
Party	Candidate	Votes	%	±%
Labour	James Johnson	20,719	49.33	
Conservative	Charles Maxwell Kirwin Taylor	12,788	30.44	
Liberal	I. Silverwood	8,497	20.23	New
Majority		7,931	18.89	
Turnout		42,004	73.59	
Labour hold		Swing		

General election October 1974: Kingston upon Hull West
Party	Candidate	Votes	%	±%
Labour	James Johnson	20,393	54.86	
Conservative	Charles Maxwell Kirwin Taylor	10,272	27.63	
Liberal	Anthony Ronald Michell	6,508	17.51	
Majority		10,121	27.23	
Turnout		37,173	64.55	
Labour hold		Swing		

General election 1979: Kingston upon Hull West
Party	Candidate	Votes	%	±%
Labour	James Johnson	19,750	55.78	
Conservative	R. E. Smith	11,592	32.74	
Liberal	S. J. Foston	3,656	10.33	
National Front	M. D. Fox	411	1.16	New
Majority		8,158	23.04	
Turnout		35,409	67.46	
Labour hold		Swing		

=== Elections in the 1980s ===
General election 1983: Kingston upon Hull West
Party	Candidate	Votes	%	±%
Labour	Stuart Randall	15,361	41.92	
Conservative	Martin Robert Charles Humphreys	11,707	31.95	
SDP	Stephen Unwin	9,575	26.13	New
Majority		3,654	9.97	
Turnout		36,643	63.50	
Labour hold		Swing		

General election 1987: Kingston upon Hull West
Party	Candidate	Votes	%	±%
Labour	Stuart Randall	19,527	51.94	
Conservative	Martin Robert Charles Humphreys	11,397	30.32	
SDP	Martyn Arthur Bond	6,669	17.74	
Majority		8,130	21.62	
Turnout		37,593	67.57	
Labour hold		Swing		

=== Elections in the 1990s ===
General election 1992: Kingston upon Hull West
Party	Candidate	Votes	%	±%
Labour	Stuart Randall	21,139	57.3	+5.4
Conservative	Donald M. Stewart	10,554	28.6	−1.7
Liberal Democrats	Robert D. Tress	4,867	13.2	−4.5
Natural Law	Barry J. Franklin	308	0.8	New
Majority		10,585	28.7	+7.1
Turnout		36,868	65.7	−1.9
Labour hold		Swing	+3.5	
