= Ben Wilson, 4th Baron Nunburnholme =

British peer and shipowner (1928–1998)

Ben Charles Wilson (16 July 1928 – 28 July 1998), was a British Peer, the 4th Baron Nunburnholme, and former head of the prominent English shipowning family of Thomas Wilson Sons & Co.

== Biography ==
Ben Charles Wilson was born on 16 July 1928.

He died on 28 July 1998.

== Ancestry ==
Ancestors of Ben Wilson, 4th Baron Nunburnholme

16. Thomas Wilson (1792–1869)
8. Charles Wilson, 1st Baron Nunburnholme (1833–1907)
17. Susannah West (1796–1879)
4. Charles Wilson, 2nd Baron Nunburnholme (1875–1924)
18. Col. William Wellesley (1813–1888)
9. Florence Wellesley (1853–1932)
19. Jane Hayden (died 1901)
2. Charles Wilson, 3rd Baron Nunburnholme (1904–1974)
20. Robert Carrington, 2nd Baron Carrington (1796–1868)
10. Charles Wynn-Carington, 1st Marquess of Lincolnshire (1843–1928)
21. Hon. Charlotte Drummond-Willoughby (1815–1879)
5. Lady Marjorie Wynn-Carington (1880–1968)
22. Charles Harbord, 5th Baron Suffield (1830–1914)
11. Hon. Cecilia Harbord (1856–1934)
23. Cecilia Baring (c. 1834 – 1911)
1. Ben Wilson, 4th Baron Nunburnholme
24. Henry Thynne, 3rd Marquess of Bath (1797–1837)
12. John Thynne, 4th Marquess of Bath (1831–1896)
25. Hon. Harriet Baring (1804–1892)
6. Thomas Thynne, 5th Marquess of Bath (1862–1946)
26. Thomas Vesey, 3rd Viscount de Vesci (1803–1875)
13. Frances Vesey (1840–1915)
27. Lady Emma Herbert (1819–1884)
3. Lady Mary Thynne (1903–1974)
Paternity disputed
7. Violet Mordaunt (1869–1928)
30. Sir Thomas Moncreiffe, 7th Baronet (1822–1879)
15. Harriet Moncreiffe (1848–1906)
31. Lady Louisa Hay-Drummond (died 1898)

Peerage of the United Kingdom
Preceded by Charles John Wilson	Baron Nunburnholme; 1974–1998	Succeeded by Charles Thomas Wilson
