= St James' Church, Warter =

Church building in Warter, East Riding of Yorkshire, England

Coordinates: 53.94272°N 0.67619°W

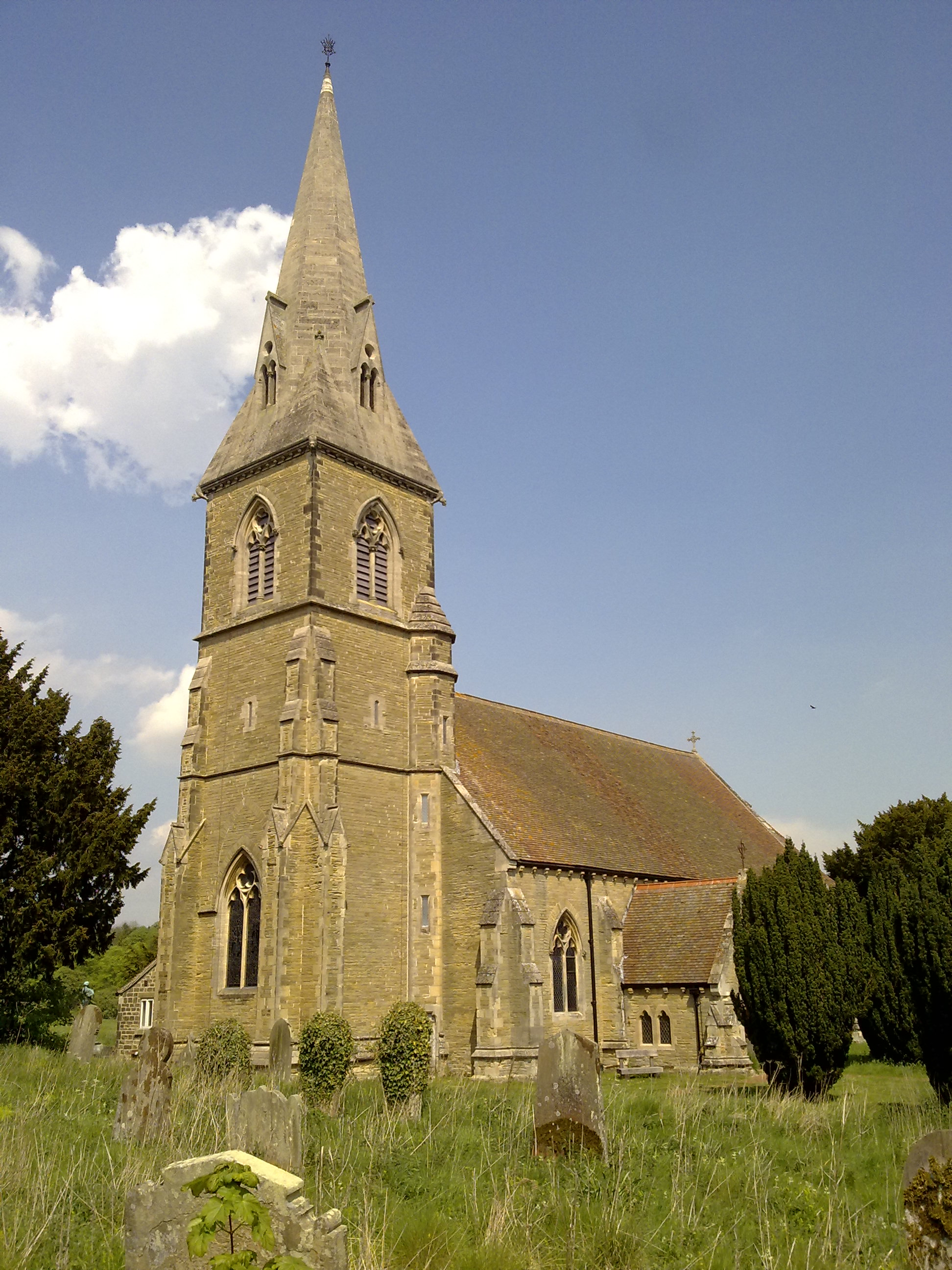
St James' Church

St James’ Church lies in Warter, an estate village in England, in the Yorkshire Wolds, part of the East Riding of Yorkshire.

== Origins and history ==
This grade II listed building was built in 1862–3 for Josslyn Francis Pennington, 5th Lord Muncaster, and it is thought that this was the third church built on this site.

It was built in an imitation of a 13th-century Gothic style to the designs of the architects W. G. Habershon and A. R. Pite. The building is of ashlared stone with a tiled roof. It has a west tower with a broach spire, a five-bay nave with south porch, a short chancel with a polygonal apse, and a north vestry.

The church was declared redundant in 1990 and is now maintained by the Yorkshire Wolds Heritage Centre. It was restored in 2006 with substantial grants from the Heritage Lottery Fund and LEADER + East Riding. Help was also given by the Normandby Charitable Trust, the Gilbert Bayes Trust and the Hull and East Riding Charitable Trust. The church and its churchyard contain works by two of England's most accomplished sculptors, Sir George Frampton and Gilbert Bayes, and has stained-glass windows designed by Robert Anning Bell.

The church stands on the site of a much larger priory church belonging to the medieval priory of Augustinian or Black Canons founded at Warter by Geoffrey Fitz Pain in 1132. Warter was not a wealthy priory but it did hold the lordships of Warter, Seaton Ross, Wheldrake, Preston in Holderness, Waxholme, Fraisthorpe and Auburn, the church at Lund and the hospital of St Giles at Beverley, all in the East Riding, as well as the churches of Barton and Askham in Westmorland. The site of this priory is now a scheduled monument to the north of the church.

When the priory was suppressed in August 1536 there were 12 canons. Two of them, the sub-prior and the kitchener, attempted to re-establish the monastery following the great rising against the government of Henry VIII of England, known as the “Pilgrimage of Grace”. For this they were arrested and executed as traitors at York in February 1537.

In the late 17th century the priory estate was acquired by the Pennington family of Muncaster Castle in Cumberland, who built Warter Hall, subsequently Warter Priory, which stood a mile to the south-west of the village. The house was demolished in 1972.

Following a government report which was most critical of the run-down state of the village, the Penningtons, now the Lords Muncaster, began rebuilding the village and this rebuilding was continued by Charles Henry Wilson, a wealthy Hull shipowner and Liberal MP who had purchased the estate in 1878. Wilson was created Lord Nunburnholme in 1906 and died the following year. From 1907 to 1929 the village, as part of the estate, was controlled by the Dowager Lady Nunburnholme. In 1929 the estate was purchased by George Vestey and then in 1968 by the Marquis of Normanby. Warter Priory was demolished in 1972 and in 1998 the estate was purchased by Malcolm Healey.

Warter has several notable buildings including a row of thatched cottages and Manor House Farm built in 1732 using stone from the demolished medieval priory.

== Church interior ==
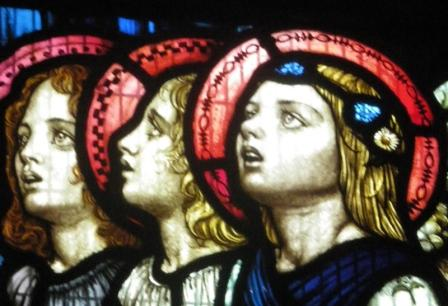
Robert Anning Bell's stained-glass window in memory of Gerald Valerian Wilson

There are works in the church by Sir George Frampton and Robert Anning Bell. Frampton created a marble monument to Lady Isabel Wilson, who was the daughter of the 7th Duke of Roxburghe and the wife of Guy Greville Wilson. She died in childbirth in 1905, at the age of 26. Frampton was also the sculptor of the monument to Charles Henry Wilson who became 1st Lord Nunburnholme. In the monument there are references to the Wilson shipping firm. There is also a small plaque by Frampton dedicated to Gerald Valerian Wilson.

There are stained-glass windows designed by Robert Anning Bell, one depicting Lord and Lady Nunburnholme with a border of sailing ships and the arms of the city of Kingston upon Hull and the other dedicated to Gerald Valerian Wilson, the Nunburnholmes' son who died at the age of 23 in 1908. There are also several monuments and inscriptions in the church to members of the Pennington family.

In 2011, two stained glass lunette windows by Robert Anning Bell, which had been in storage since 1966, were placed in the nave of the church following restoration. They had originally been in a mausoleum built in the churchyard to house the remains of Lady Isabel Wilson, which also contained her marble effigy. One of the windows depicts Lady Isabel and her dead baby being carried to heaven by six angels watched by her husband. The other window depicts the personifications of Lady Isabel's virtues – Courage, Hope and "Love to the Death" – surrounded by child-angel musicians.

== Churchyard ==
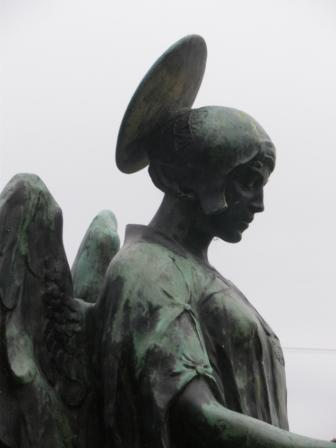
Gilbert Bayes' bronze monument in remembrance of Gerald Valerian Wilson

On the north side of the churchyard is the private burial ground of the Wilson family, the Lords Nunburnholme.

There are two signed bronze sculptures by Gilbert Bayes, a pupil of Sir George Frampton and a key figure in the "New Sculpture Movement". One, commemorating the 1st Lord Nunburnholme who died in 1907, is in the form of the figure of Victory with a laurel wreath, while the other, nearer the church, is in memory of his youngest son, Gerald Valerian Wilson. It represents a standing angel, with a nimbus, reading the Book of John. The smaller details of these memorials were stolen many years ago. The two sculptures originally stood in the Italian Garden of Warter Priory and were moved to St James' in 1929. They stand near a table-top tomb to the 2nd Lord Nunburnholme and a grave slab to Edith, Countess of Chesterfield, daughter of the 1st Lord Nunburnholme.

A classical mausoleum was added to the side of the church to contain Sir George Frampton's memorial to Lady Isabel Wilson, the wife of Guy Greville Wilson, who died in 1905. It was demolished in 1966 and the memorial moved inside the church. Its site is now marked by a grass-covered mound. A brief glimpse of the mausoleum may be seen in the Yorkshire Film Archive film "The East Riding" at 04.29 (YFA 1414).

The remainder of the churchyard is being conserved as a wildlife habitat.

== See also ==
- Listed buildings in Warter
- Warter Priory
