= 1907 Kingston upon Hull West by-election =

UK parliamentary by-election

- 11 November 1907

Candidate	Wilson	Bartley	Holmes
Party	Liberal	Conservative	Labour
Popular vote	5,623	5,382	4,512
Percentage	36.2%	34.7%	29.1%
MP before election
Charles Wilson
Liberal
Subsequent MP
Guy Wilson
Liberal

The 1907 Kingston upon Hull West by-election was a parliamentary by-election held in England for the UK House of Commons constituency of Kingston upon Hull West on 11 November 1907.

The seat had been held for the Liberal Party by members of the Wilson family since its creation in 1885, and the by-election was won by the Liberal candidate Guy Wilson, who was the brother of the outgoing Member of Parliament (MP).

== Vacancy ==
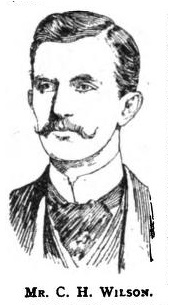

The seat had become vacant when the sitting MP Charles Wilson succeeded to his father's peerage as the 2nd Baron Nunburnholme. He had held the seat for less than two years, having been elected at the 1906 general election after the retirement from the Commons of his father Charles Henry Wilson, who had held the seat since 1885.

== Candidates ==
Three candidates contested the seat.

The Liberal candidate Guy Wilson was a former officer in the British Army, and a director of the family shipping company Thomas Wilson Sons & Co.

The Conservative Party candidate was Sir George Trout Bartley, a cockney who had been the founder of the National Penny Bank and was MP for Islington North from 1885 until his defeat in 1906.

The Labour Party nominated a candidate for the first time: James Holmes, who had been an unsuccessful candidate in Birmingham East at the 1906 general election.

== Result ==
1907 Kingston upon Hull West by-election
Party	Candidate	Votes	%	±%
Liberal	Guy Wilson	5,623	36.2	−21.3
Conservative	George Trout Bartley	5,382	34.7	−7.8
Labour	James Holmes	4,512	29.1	New
Majority		241	1.5	−13.5
Turnout		15,517	75.4	+0.8
Liberal hold		Swing	-6.8	

== Aftermath ==
Bartley did not stand for Parliament again. Wilson held the seat (with much increased majorities) until the constituency was abolished in 1918. He then rejected the coalition coupon which he had been given, and was heavily defeated at the 1918 general election.

The Labour Party did not contest Kingston upon Hull West again in either of the 1910 elections. Holmes stood again only one more time, at the Crewe by-election in July 1912, but came a poor third.
