= Stuart Randall =

Stuart Randall may refer to:

- Stuart Randall, Baron Randall of St Budeaux, British politician
- Stuart Randall (actor), American band leader, singer, and actor
