= Lord Randall (disambiguation) =

"Lord Randall" is an Anglo-Scottish border ballad.

Lord Randall may also refer to:

- Stuart Randall, Baron Randall of St Budeaux (1938–2012), British Labour politician and MP for Kingston upon Hull West
- John Randall, Baron Randall of Uxbridge (born 1955), British Conservative politician and MP for Uxbridge and South Ruislip
