= Charles Wilson, 2nd Baron Nunburnholme =

British peer (1875–1924)

Major The Right Honourable The Lord Nunburnholme CB DSO
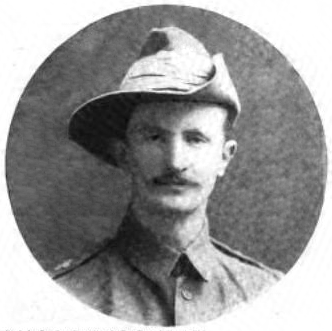
- In The Sketch, 20 February 1901

Member of the House of Lords
- Lord Temporal
- In office 21 October 1907 – 15 August 1924
- Preceded by: The 1st Baron Nunburnholme
- Succeeded by: The 3rd Baron Nunburnholme

Member of Parliament for Kingston upon Hull West
- In office 1906–1907
- Preceded by: Charles Wilson
- Succeeded by: Guy Wilson

Personal details
- Born: Charles Henry Wellesley Wilson; 24 January 1875 Cottingham, England
- Died: 15 August 1924 (aged 49) Leeds, England
- Spouse: Lady Marjorie Wynn-Carrington (m. 1901)
- Relations: Lt-Col. The Hon. Guy Wilson (brother)
- Military career
- Burial place: Warter, East Yorkshire
- Allegiance: United Kingdom
- Branch: British Army
- Service years: 1893–1908, 1918
- Rank: Major (Honorary Colonel)
- Units: East Yorkshire Regiment; Royal Garrison Artillery
- Commands: Hon Col, 5th (Cyclist) Bn, East Yorkshire Regiment (TF) and East Riding Volunteer Brigade (VTC)
- Conflicts: Second Boer War; First World War
- Awards: Companion of the Bath; Distinguished Service Order
- Other work: MP for Kingston upon Hull West 1906–1907; Lord Lieutenant of East Yorkshire and President of the York (East Riding) Territorial Force Association 1908–1924

Charles Henry Wellesley Wilson, 2nd Baron Nunburnholme (24 January 1875 – 15 August 1924), was a British peer, and one of the heirs to the Thomas Wilson Sons & Co., a Hull-based shipping company that built a near-monopoly over affordable travel packages from Scandinavia and the Baltic. He was an officer in the Volunteers and saw active service in the Second Boer War and World War I. During the later war he was distinguished for the number of new units that he recruited for the war effort, notably the "Hull Pals".

== Biography ==
He was born in Cottingham, the eldest son of Charles Wilson, 1st Baron Nunburnholme (1833–1907), who with his brother Arthur were joint managers of the firm founded by their father Thomas. The company had been managed by a non-family managing director since 1901, and was sold in 1916. His mother, Florence Jane Helen Wellesley, was a great-niece of the Duke of Wellington. Young Charles was educated at Eton.

== Military career ==
Wilson was commissioned as a 2nd lieutenant in the part-time 2nd Volunteer Battalion of the East Yorkshire Regiment on 2 December 1893, transferring to the Yorkshire Hussars on 5 September 1894. He resigned his commission on 1 February 1895, but was re-commissioned into the 2nd Volunteer Bn of the East Yorkshires on 4 March 1896, this time as a captain.

=== Boer War ===
After the outbreak of the Second Boer War in October 1899, a corps of imperial volunteers from London was formed in late December 1899. The corps included infantry, mounted infantry and artillery divisions and was authorized with the name City of London Imperial Volunteers. It proceeded to South Africa in January 1900, returned in October the same year, and was disbanded in December 1900. Wilson was appointed a lieutenant of the mounted infantry division on 3 January 1900, with the temporary rank of Lieutenant in the Army, and served as such until the corps was disbanded. He was present at the Relief of Kimberley and operations in the Orange Free State from February to May 1900, including actions at Karee Siding, Vet River (5 & 6 May), Zand River. He was in the operations in the Transvaal in May and June, including actions near Johannesburg, Pretoria and Diamond Hill (11 June). He was again in the Transvaal, west of Pretoria, from July to 29 November, including actions at Zilikats Nek and Blands River (4–16 August), and operations in Orange River Colony in July. He was awarded the Distinguished Service Order and Mentioned in dispatches, and received the Queen's South Africa Medal with four clasps. He was granted the honorary rank of lieutenant in the army.

He ended his Volunteer career as a major in the 2nd Volunteer Battalion, East Yorkshire Regiment. He did not transfer with the battalion when the Volunteers were subsumed into the Territorial Force (TF) in 1908 (by then he was in Parliament first as an MP, then as a peer), but as Lord-Lieutenant of the East Riding of Yorkshire (appointed 24 November 1908), Nunburnholme became ex officio President of the York (East Riding) Territorial Force Association, which was responsible for administering all the TF units in the county.

=== World War I ===
Alfred Leete's recruitment poster for Kitchener's Army

On 6 August 1914, less than 48 hours after Britain's declaration of war, Parliament sanctioned an increase of 500,000 men for the Regular Army, and on 11 August the newly appointed Secretary of State for War, Earl Kitchener of Khartoum issued his famous call to arms: 'Your King and Country Need You', urging the first 100,000 volunteers to come forward. This group of six divisions with supporting arms became known as Kitchener's First New Army, or 'K1'. The flood of volunteers overwhelmed the ability of the army to absorb and organise them, and by the time the K5 units came into existence many of them were being organised as 'Pals battalions' under the auspices of mayors and corporations of towns up and down the country.

On 29 August Nunburnholme had a meeting with Kitchener at the War Office (WO), at which he and the East Riding Territorial Force Association (ERTFA) were authorised to raise a local battalion in Hull. This was unusual because most of the county TFAs were fully engaged with recruiting and equipping their existing TF units and had no time for the New Army units (in March 1915 the War Office had politely to ask the TFAs to become involved in recruiting them.) The Hull Daily Mail of 31 August 1914 carried Nunburnholme's proposal to raise a 'Commercial Battalion' from men working in business offices in Hull who would serve alongside their friends. Recruitment opened the following day at Wenlock Barracks on Anlaby Road, loaned by the ERTFA, and 200 men were attested on the first day. Some came en masse, such as groups from Reckitt and Sons' chemical works and the North Eastern Railway Dock Superintendents' office. The battalion reached its full establishment (just over 1000 men) on 5 September, and recruiting immediately began for a 2nd Hull Battalion, 'The Tradesmen'. Wenlock Barracks and the peacetime Army Recruiting Office at Pryme Street were inadequate for the surge of volunteers from all over the East Riding, so Nunburnholme borrowed Hull City Hall and opened it on 6 September as the Central Hull Recruiting Office for all the units being raised in the city.

On 7 September, the WO not only authorised Nunburnholme and the ERTFA to raise the 2nd Hull battalion, but also a heavy battery (1st Hull) and associated ammunition column of the Royal Garrison Artillery (RGA), many of whose recruits came from the shipyards associated with the Wilson shipping line and was temporarily commanded by one of its ships' captains.

The "Tradesmen's" battalion was completed within three days, and Nunburnholme immediately began raising a 3rd Hull Battalion: the 'Sportsmen'. The Hon Stanley Jackson, the former England cricket captain, was the chief speaker at a public meeting held at the Park Street Artillery Barracks on 12 September to raise recruits for this battalion, which reached full strength in October, including many men from Hull Docks. Lord Nunburnholme organised a second recruiting campaign in Hull in November, which raised a further 894 men for the 4th Hull Battalion which took any able-bodied recruits, regardless of background, and for want of a better name was known in the Yorkshire vernacular as "T'others".

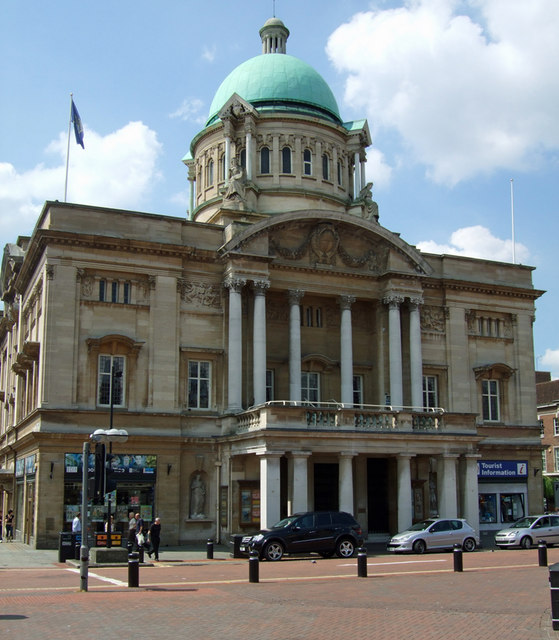
Hull City Hall

By the time voluntary enlistment ended at the end of 1915, Nunburnholme and the East Riding TA had been responsible for raising not only the Second and Third Line TF units in the county, but the following New Army units:

- 11th (1st Hull) Heavy Battery and Ammunition Column, RGA
- 124th (2nd Hull) Heavy Battery and Ammunition Column, RGA
- 146th (3rd Hull) Heavy Battery and Ammunition Column, RGA
- 31st (Hull) Divisional Ammunition Column, Royal Field Artillery
- 10th (Service) Bn, East Yorkshire Regiment (1st Hull)
- 11th (Service) Bn, East Yorkshire Regiment (2nd Hull)
- 12th (Service) Bn, East Yorkshire Regiment (3rd Hull)
- 13th (Service) Bn, East Yorkshire Regiment (4th Hull)
- 14th (Reserve) Bn, East Yorkshire Regiment (5th Hull)

Lady Nunburnholme was also active, setting up the Hull Voluntary Aid Committee at Peel House on Beverley Road, Hull, which organised training for nurses of the Voluntary Aid Detachments, winter clothing for troops at the front and aid parcels to British Prisoners of War (PoWs). On Christmas Eve 1914 every officer and man in the Hull Pals and Heavy Artillery received a Christmas Card from Lord Nunburnholme consisting of a picture of St George slaying the dragon with the badge of the East Yorkshire Regiment and coloured bands representing the distinctive armbands worn by the different battalions and batteries before they received their uniforms. In 1916, Lord and Lady Nunburnholme appealed for donations to provide Chiristmas comforts for all the Hull and East Riding men serving overseas. The response was immediate, and for the remaining Christmases of the war, the fund was taken over by the Lord Mayor of Hull. The Wilson family sold the shipping line to Sir John Ellerman in 1916, possibly as a result of the heavy losses it had suffered by enemy action during the early years of the war.

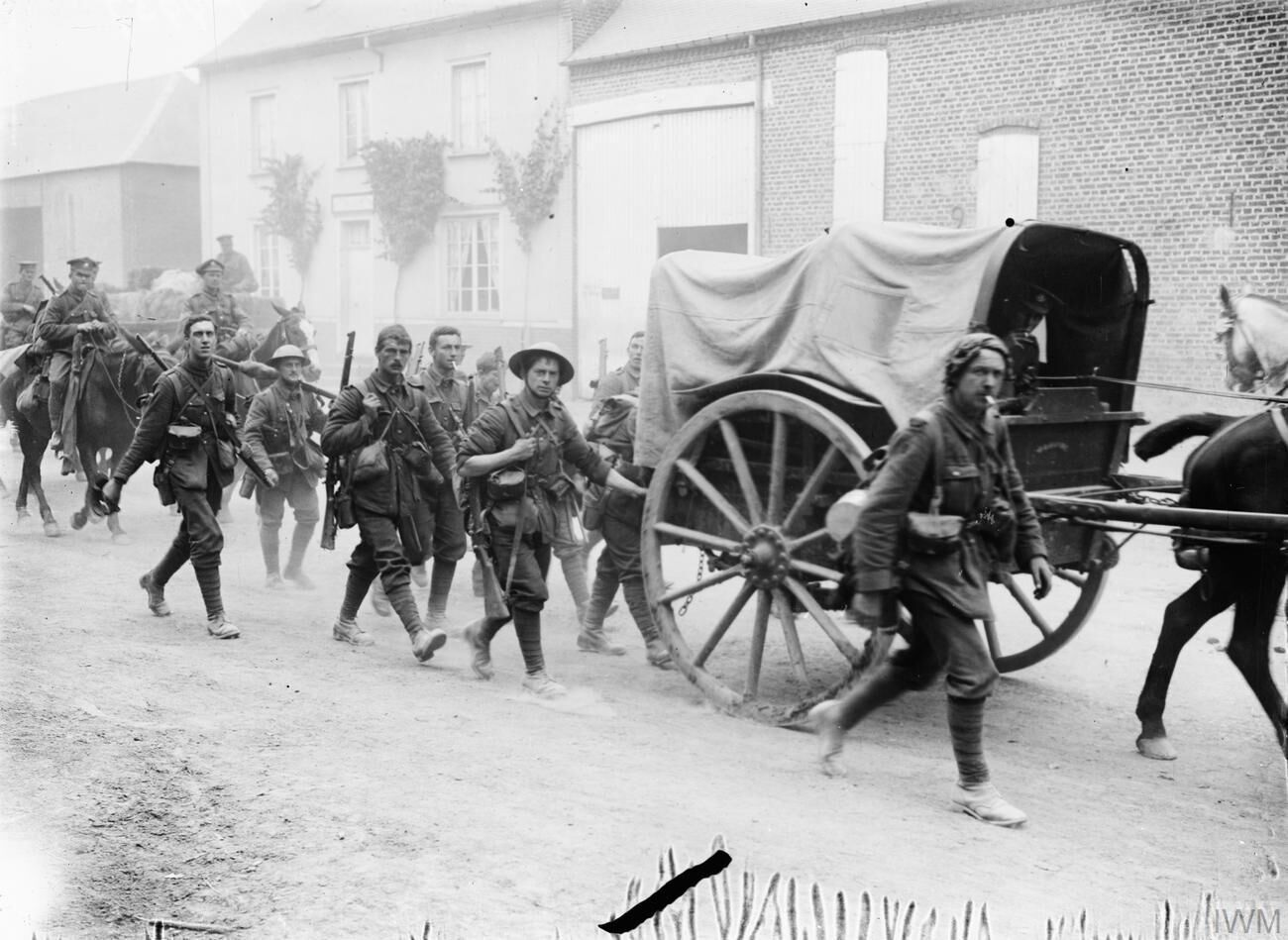
Lewis gun section of the 10th Bn East Yorks (Hull Commercials) near Doullens, 28 June 1916

When the 4th Bn East Yorkshires (TF) landed in France in April 1915, Nunburnholme published a new appeal for volunteers in the Hull Daily Mail. There was also a flurry of recruitment for home defence forces, drawn from men who were too old or otherwise ineligible for the army. The Hull Golfers Battalion was soon 200 strong, and was replaced by a 2800-strong armed Civic Guard. Nunburnholme began an appeal for donations to organise these men into the East Riding Volunteer Brigade of three battalions in the Volunteer Training Corps. On 21 November 1917 he was appointed their honorary colonel and from the same date he was also Hon Colonel of the 5th (Cyclist) Battalion, East Yorkshire Regiment (TF). Lord Nunburnholme was awarded a civil Companionship of the Order of the Bath (CB) in the 1918 New Year Honours for his war work. (In the same Honours list his mother was awarded the Order of the British Empire (OBE) for her work for Hull Naval Hospital.)

The "Hull Pals" battalions formed a complete brigade in 31st Division, and after a short spell in Egypt they served on the Western Front from 1916 until the end of the war, as did the 2nd and 3rd Hull heavy batteries. The 11th (1st Hull) Heavy Battery had been intended for 11th (Northern) Division but was left behind for training when that formation was rushed out to Gallipoli in 1915. Instead, the battery was equipped with obsolescent howitzers and sent to East Africa, where it fought in a hard campaign in 1916–1917.

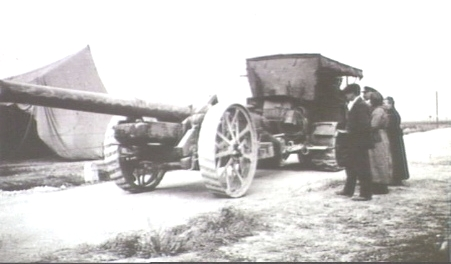
6-inch Mk XIX gun, as used by 545th Siege Battery in France 1918

The remaining fit men of the 1st Hull Battery returned to England on 31 January 1918. On 1 March the battery was reformed at Aldershot as 545th Siege Battery, RGA. Its Commanding Officer, Major Basil Floyd, set out to get back as many veterans of the 1st Hull Bty as he could from other RGA units where they had been posted from convalescence hospitals. Lord Nunburnholme, having raised the original battery in 1914, now joined it as an active officer. Although he ranked as an Honorary Colonel, he was commissioned as a temporary captain in the RGA on 15 May 1918. After completing the battery officers' course at Lydd he joined the 545th on 14 September and served as second-in-command to Major Floyd. Re-equipped with modern guns, the battery served with Fourth Army in the pursuit of the defeated German Army in the latter stages of the war.

After the Armistice with Germany came into force on 11 November 1918, the TF and New Army units were progressively demobilised and sent home. From 17 November to the end of January 1919, Lady Nunburnholme and her Peel House VAD workers welcomed home the shiploads of returning British PoWs at Riverside Quay, Hull. Lord Nunburnholme was back in Hull in time to officiate for the Lord Mayor on 30 April 1919 to welcome home the cadre of the 7th (Service) Bn, East Yorkshires, before they marched to Beverley to disband. The cadres of the remaining battalions of the Hull Pals arrived at Hull Paragon Station on 26 May and after being inspected by Nunburnholme they marched through the city to the Guildhall and officially disbanded.

== Political career ==
Wilson held the ceremonial position of Sheriff of Hull in 1899 and 1900. He was elected at the 1906 general election as Liberal Member of Parliament (MP) for Kingston upon Hull West, succeeding his father who had held the seat since 1885. Charles Sr. was ennobled as Baron Nunburnholme when he left the House of Commons. When he died in 1907, Charles Jr. inherited the Barony, after only a year in the House of Commons, forcing a by-election at which his younger brother Guy Wilson was elected in his place.

Lord Nunburnholme was Lord Lieutenant of the East Riding of Yorkshire from 1908 to 1924.

== Family ==
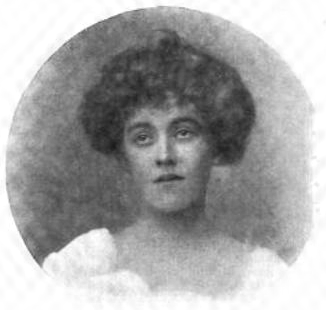
Lady Marjorie Wynn-Carington

Wilson married, on 12 February 1901, Lady Marjorie Wynn-Carrington, DStJ, eldest daughter of the Marquess of Lincolnshire. Lady Nunburnholme was active in organising the opening of the Hull Naval Hospital in World War I. She died on 17 June 1968.

They had three children: Monica, Charles and David. Monica, who married Edward Turnour, 6th Earl Winterton, died 9 November 1974. Charles became, upon his father's death in August 1924, 3rd Baron Nunburnholme. David served as a pilot officer in the Royal Air Force Volunteer Reserve and was killed in action on 23 March 1941.

Lord Nunburnholme died in Leeds on 15 August 1924 and was buried at Warter, East Yorkshire.

== Ancestry ==
Ancestors of Charles Wilson, 2nd Baron Nunburnholme

8. David Wilson (1746–1810)
4. Thomas Wilson (1792–1869)
9. Elizabeth Grey (b. c. 1750)
2. Charles Wilson, 1st Baron Nunburnholme (1833–1907)
10. John West
5. Susannah West (1796–1879)
11. Grace Harrop
1. Charles Wilson, 2nd Baron Nunburnholme
24. Garret Wesley, 1st Earl of Mornington (1735–1781)
12. Rev. Hon. Gerald Wellesley (1770–1848)
25. Hon. Anne Hill-Trevor (1742–1831)
6. Col. William Wellesley (1813–1888)
26. Charles Cadogan, 1st Earl Cadogan (1728–1807)
13. Lady Emily Cadogan (1773–1839)
27. Mary Churchill (born 1758)
3. Florence Wellesley (1853–1932)
14. Thomas Hayden
7. Jane Hayden (died 1901)

== See also ==
- Thomas Wilson Sons & Co.

== Notes ==
Parliament of the United Kingdom
| Preceded by Charles Wilson | Member of Parliament for Kingston upon Hull West; 1906–1907 | Succeeded by Guy Wilson |
Honorary titles
| Preceded by The Lord Herries of Terregles | Lord Lieutenant of the East Riding of Yorkshire; 1908–1924 | Succeeded by The Lord Deramore |
Peerage of the United Kingdom
| Preceded by Charles Wilson | Baron Nunburnholme; 1907–1924; Member of the House of Lords (1907–1924) | Succeeded by Charles Wilson |
