= Guy Wilson (politician) =

British politician (1877–1943)

Lieutenant-Colonel Guy Greville Wilson
- Guy Greville Wilson

Member of Parliament for Kingston upon Hull West
- In office 1907–1918

Personal details
- Born: May 19, 1877
- Died: February 1, 1943 (aged 65)
- Party: Liberal
- Spouse(s): Lady Isabel Ines-Ker (m. 1904–d. 1905); Avery Fowell Buxton (m. 1911)
- Parent(s): Charles Henry Wilson, 1st Baron Nunburnholme; Florence Jane Helen Wellesley
- Education: Eton College
- Awards: Distinguished Service Order (DSO); Companion of the Order of St Michael and St George (CMG)

Military service
- Allegiance: United Kingdom
- Branch/service: British Army
- Rank: Lieutenant-Colonel
- Battles/wars: Second Boer War, World War I

Lieutenant-Colonel Guy Greville Wilson, CMG, DSO (19 May 1877 – 1 February 1943) was a British soldier, company director, and Liberal Party politician from Kingston upon Hull. His family owned Thomas Wilson Sons & Co., which was once the largest private shipowning concern in the world.

== Family and military service ==
Wilson was the second son of Charles Henry Wilson (later the first Baron Nunburnholme) and his wife Florence Jane Helen Wellesley. He was educated at Eton, and in February 1895 he was commissioned in the Militia as a second lieutenant in the 3rd Battalion of the East Yorkshire Regiment. He transferred to the Regular British Army in the 11th Hussars on 11 May 1898, and served in South Africa with this regiment during the Second Boer War, during which he was promoted to lieutenant on 12 June 1900. He was mentioned in despatches by Lord Kitchener in his final despatch dated 23 June 1902, returned to the United Kingdom in August 1902, and was awarded the Distinguished Service Order (DSO) in October 1902. He retired from the full-time army service in 1903, but joined the East Riding of Yorkshire Yeomanry, being commissioned as a captain on 17 December 1904 and promoted to major on 20 December 1912. He later became lieutenant-colonel of the 1st battalion of the regiment on active service during World War I from 1915 to 1916. He was appointed Honorary Colonel of his former regiment, now the 26th (East Riding of York Yeomanry) Armoured Car Company, Royal Tank Regiment, on 2 January 1932.

Wilson was married twice, firstly on 23 June 1904 to Lady Isabel Ines-Ker, daughter of the 7th Duke of Roxburghe. She died in childbirth on 12 October 1905 (the year after their marriage). He married again in May 1911, to Avery Fowell Buxton.

== Political career ==
His father Charles had been a Member of Parliament (MP) for over 30 years, and when he retired from the House of Commons in 1906 before being awarded a peerage, Charles's older son Charles H. W. Wilson was elected at the 1906 general election to succeed him as MP for Kingston upon Hull West. However, their father died the following year, and Charles Jr. succeeded to his peerage, thereby gaining a seat in the House of Lords and automatically vacating his seat in the Commons. At the resulting by-election in November 1907, Guy was elected to succeed him, with a narrow majority of 241 votes (1.5% of the total) over his Conservative Party opponent.

He was re-elected at both the January 1910 and December 1910 elections and held the seat until the constituency was abolished at the 1918. He then stood in the new Kingston upon Hull North West constituency, where he was one of 159 Liberal candidates to receive the "coalition coupon", which signified the endorsement of the Conservative-dominated Coalition Government led by David Lloyd George. However, Wilson repudiated the coupon, and was overwhelmingly defeated by the Conservative Party candidate Lambert Ward; Wilson took only 21.0% of the votes.

After his defeat in 1918, Wilson did not stand for Parliament again.

He was later made a Companion of the Order of St Michael and St George (CMG).

Parliament of the United Kingdom
Preceded by Charles Wilson	Member of Parliament for Kingston upon Hull West; 1907–1918	Constituency abolished
