= Listed buildings in Warter =

Warter is a civil parish in the county of the East Riding of Yorkshire, England. It contains ten listed buildings that are recorded in the National Heritage List for England. All the listed buildings are designated at Grade II, the lowest of the three grades, which is applied to "buildings of national importance and special interest". The parish contains the village of Warter and the surrounding countryside. The listed buildings consist of houses and cottages, two boundary stones, a milestone, a church, and two tombs and statues associated with the church.

== Buildings ==
Name and location	Photograph	Date	Notes
Coatgares Farmhouse; 53.94233°N 0.67809°W		1731–32	The house is in stone and brick on a chamfered plinth, and has a double-span pantile roof with oversailing verges and shaped bargeboards. There are two storeys, and double depth plan with a lower rear range, and a front range of four bays. The doorway has attached Tuscan columns and a full entablature, and the windows are sashes.
Boundary stone at NGR SE 871539; 53.97450°N 0.67300°W		Early 19th century	The boundary stone consists of a sandstone slab about 0.3 metres (1 ft 0 in) in height. It is inscribed "W T B".
Boundary stone at NGR SE 883542; 53.97689°N 0.65433°W		Early 19th century	The boundary stone consists of a sandstone slab about 0.3 metres (1 ft 0 in) in height. It is inscribed "W T B".
Milestone; 53.93952°N 0.70189°W		Early 19th century	The milestone is on south side of Inrea Hill (B1246 road). It consists of a sandstone slab with chamfered corners inscribed with the distance to Driffield.
St James' Church; 53.94273°N 0.67615°W		1862–63	The church is in stone with a tile roof, and consists of a nave, a south porch, a chancel with a polygonal apse and a north vestry, and a west steeple. The steeple has a tower with a moulded plinth, angle buttresses with gablets, moulded string courses, two-light bell openings with hood moulds, and a broach spire with two-light lucarnes.
1–4 Cross Green; 53.94194°N 0.67767°W		Late 19th century	A row of four cottages in whitewashed red brick with thatched roofs. There are two storeys and seven bays. Each cottage has a projecting porch with trellised sides and a thatched gable. The windows are sashes, some horizontally sliding, the upper floor windows in gabled dormers.
Ornamental Cottages; 53.94093°N 0.68647°W		Late 19th century	A group of three cottages in red brick with a tile roof. There are two storeys and six bays, in the form of a central range with gabled cross wings, flanked by recessed wings. The gables have bargeboards on shaped brackets and finials. The left gable has a jettied upper floor with applied timber framing, and contains casement windows. The right gable has tile hanging and a tripartite sash window. The central range contains a balustered porch, and above are horizontal sliding sash windows. The windows on the ground floor and on the wings are sashes.
Cottages opposite Warter School; 53.94118°N 0.67753°W	—	Late 19th century	A group of three cottages in red brick, with detailing in blue and white brick, a decorative floor band, overhanging eaves, and half-hipped slate roofs. There are two storeys and five bays, the middle three bays projecting. In the centre is a gabled porch with a segmental-arched opening with an impost band, and a keystone. The outer bays have a porch in the angles. Above the central porch is a round-arched window under a gablet, and on each wing is a gablet. Most of the windows are casements under chamfered segmental gauged brick heads.
Statue and Tomb 6 metres north of St James Church		1909	The tomb and statue are by Gilbert Bayes. The tomb is in white marble and has a rectangular plan with square corner piers and low ramped walls. To the west is a square pier capped with an egg and dart moulded cornice and an inscribed plaque. Nearby is a lead statue depicting an angel carrying a plaque inscribed with a name.
Statue and Tomb 15 metres north of St. James Church		1910	The tomb and statue are by Gilbert Bayes. The tomb is in white marble and has a rectangular plan with square corner piers and low ramped walls. To the west is a square pier with Doric columns, and on the east side is an inscription. On the tomb is a lead statue depicting an allegorical figure holding a wreath and with an inscribed scroll at the base.
