= Warter Priory =

UK country estate

Coordinates: 53.93479°N 0.70382°W

Warter Priory is an 11,000-acre (4,500 ha) country estate in the East Riding of Yorkshire, England. Yorkshire Wolds, centred one mile (1.6 km) south-west of the village of Warter and three miles (4.8 km) east of Pocklington. The estate had a country house from the 17th century until its demolition in 1972.

== The modern estate ==
In 1998 The Times described the estate as 8,080 acres (3,270 ha) of grade II and III arable land, 1,960 acres (790 ha) of grass and dale, 1,060 acres (430 ha) of woodland and 630 acres (250 ha) of let land. It was then operated by about 24 workers.

In 1998 the estate was purchased from the Constantine Phipps, 5th Marquess of Normanby by British entrepreneur Malcolm Healey for a reported £48 million. As of 2023, it had about 50 shooting drives and 63 houses.

In 2018 Healey obtained planning permission to build a new house on the site of the former country house, to create a modern informal garden and to restore the parkland.

== The country house ==
External images
- Photos of Warter Priory exterior
- Photos of Warter Priory interior
- Photos of Warter Priory demolition

A modest two-storey, five-bay country house originally named Warter Hall was built by the Pennington family of Muncaster Castle in the late 17th century. It was renamed Warter Priory in the 1830s after the former Augustinian priory in nearby Warter village. Major extensions were made in 1872, and it was re-fronted with corner towers added.

The last Lord Muncaster sold the house in 1878 to Hull shipping magnate Charles Wilson (later Lord Nunburnholme). In 1885 impressive alterations were made, including adding a great baronial-style hall and a tall entrance tower. The house now had nearly 100 rooms. Lord Nunburnholme died in 1907, survived by his widow for another 20 years.

In 1929 the house was sold to George Ellis Vestey, second son of the William Vestey, 1st Baron Vestey and Sarah Ellis. After Vestey's death, the house and the then 14,500-acre (5,900 ha) estate were sold in December 1968 for £4 million to Oswald Phipps, 4th Marquess of Normanby and the Guinness Trust, primarily for shooting.

The house contents were auctioned in March 1969, and when a tenant could not be found the house was considered surplus to requirements, as was common for country houses at that time. The house was demolished and the gardens bulldozed in 1972, the rubble being used to fill the garden lake.

In 1998 The Times reported that the house had been described as "one of Yorkshire's greatest country houses, an architectural gem" and a "French-style grand house" with a marble-staircase and a elaborately carved oak fireplace. It noted it could also have been viewed as a "Victorian monstrosity" with 100 rooms and more than 365 windows requiring 40 servants and a "bottomless pocket" to maintain.

== Medieval Augustinian priory ==
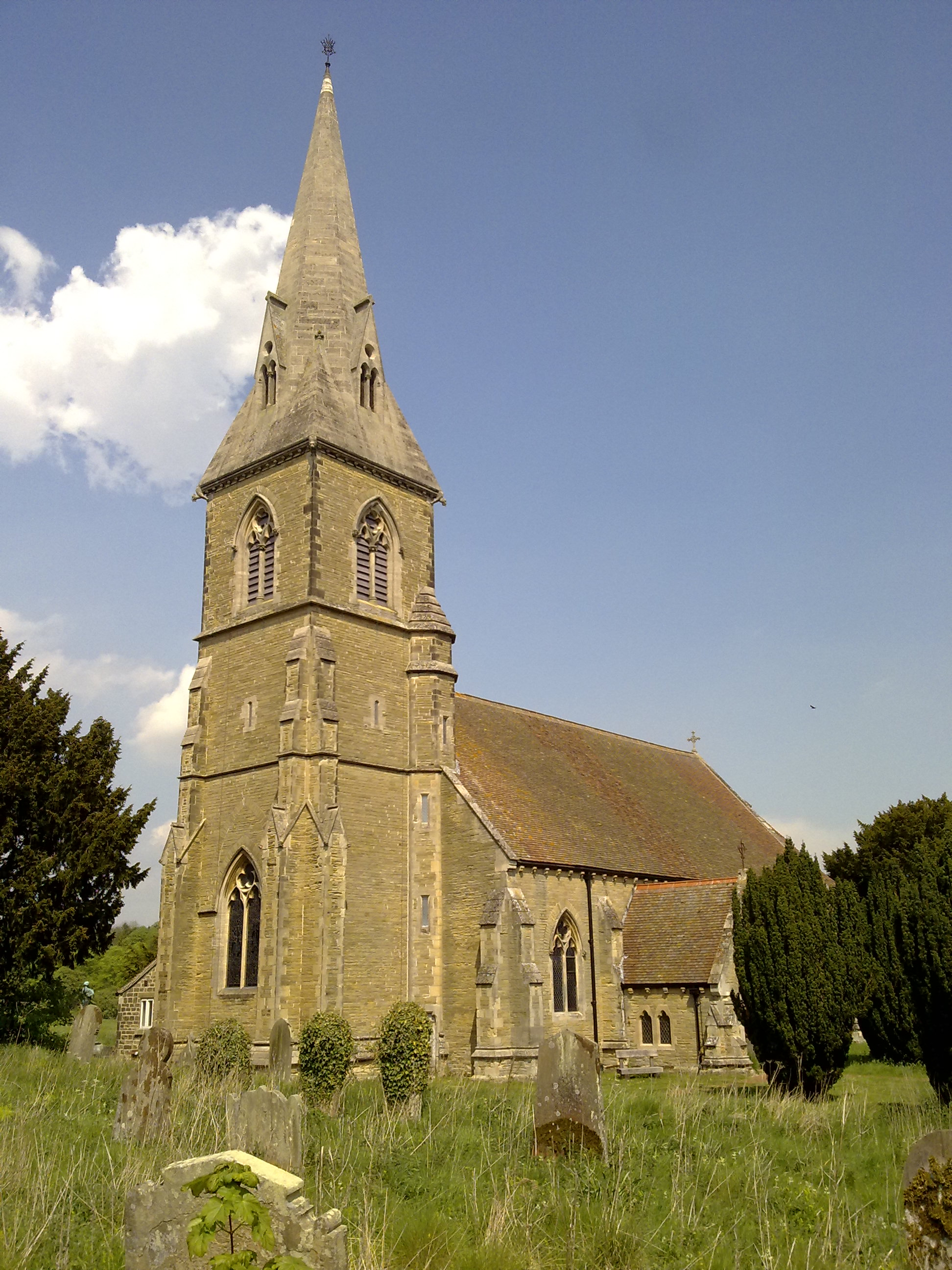
Parish Church of St James, near the site of the medieval monastic priory

The estate is not to be confused with the former medieval Augustinian priory, after which it is named, the site of which lies just north of St James' Church in Warter village. The priory was suppressed in 1536 in the dissolution of the monasteries and was granted with its considerable amount of farmland to the Earl of Rutland. Only the nave of the priory church continued in use as the parish church until 1864, when it was demolished and replaced by St James' Church. The site was made a scheduled monument in 1953.
