= Battle of Kibata =

1916 battle of World War I in East Africa

- Part of East African Campaign
Date	6–15 December 1916
Location	Kibata, German East Africa (in modern Kilwa District, Tanzania) 8°57′28″S 39°31′22″E
Result	British Victory

Belligerents
German Empire: German East Africa	United Kingdom and Empire: South Africa; India; Nyasaland

Commanders and leaders
(German Empire) Paul Emil von Lettow-Vorbeck	(Union of South Africa) Jan Smuts; (United Kingdom of Great Britain and Ireland) Henry O'Grady

Strength
Unknown	Unknown
- Location within Tanzania Battle of Kibata (Africa)

The Battle of Kibata was fought north-west from Kilwa during the East African Campaign of World War I. The British theatre commander, South African General Jan Smuts, planned to seize Kibata and prevent German forces from withdrawing southwards.

== Battle ==
On 14 October 1916, Kibata was reached and the empty fort seized; Germans had withdrawn to the hills. On 6 December 1916, main German troops led by Lettow-Vorbeck advanced on Kibata. British forces were driven out from they outposts to two redoubts on Picquet hill, north of Kibata. The German guns (One recovered from the sunken light cruiser SMS Königsberg ) opened up a bombardment against the two British held redoubts. Later German field companies attacked the redoubts but they were repulsed by the British defenders.

One of the German companies dug itself in on the western slope of Picquet Hill. This German position was named the Lodgement. By then the British forces, Baluchis from India and KAR from Nyasaland (modern-day Malawi), were well dug-in on a series of low hills near Kibata, but German troops with heavy artillery were occupying a surrounding ring of higher hills. The recent recruits became used to the shelling and they quickly adapted to trench warfare. The battle was raging which was more akin to the battlefield in Europe than in the African bush.

On the night of 15 December 1916, British forces attacked the Lodgement German position near British redoubts. The British soldiers in this attack used Mills bombs for the first time in East Africa. The Germans fell back and the Lodgement was occupied by soldiers from the King's African Rifles, supported by a section of Loyal North Lancashire machine gunners.

On 1 January 1917, two 5-inch howitzers of the 14th Howitzer Battery, Royal Garrison Artillery, had arrived at Kibata, which signalled the end of German hopes of destroying the British garrison.

== Aftermath ==
A few days later, Germans withdrew six of nine field companies from the Kibata area to the north to meet General Smuts main British troops which were fighting for crossings over the Rufiji River. On 6 January 1917, Brigadier General O'Grady ordered a general advance and the KAR Askari quickly took the hill crests previously occupied by the Germans.

== Sources ==
- Anderson, Ross (2001). World War I in East Africa 1916-1918 (History PhD). University of Glasgow.
- Lt-Col Ross Anderson, The Forgotten Front: The East African Campaign, Stroud: Tempus, 2004, ISBN 0-7524-2344-4.
- Chisholm, Hugh (1922). The Encyclopædia Britannica, The Twelfth Edition, Volume 2. New York: The Encyclopædia Britannica Company, LTD.
- Rupert Drake, The Road to Lindi: Hull Boys in Africa: The 1st (Hull) Heavy Battery Royal Garrison Artillery in East Africa and France 1914–1919, Brighton: Reveille Press, 2013, ISBN 978-1-908336-56-9.
- Gen Sir Martin Farndale, History of the Royal Regiment of Artillery: The Forgotten Fronts and the Home Base 1914–18, Woolwich: Royal Artillery Institution, 1988, ISBN 1-870114-05-1.
