= Mark Hewitson =

British politician (1897–1973)

Member of Parliament for Kingston upon Hull West
- In office 26 May 1955 – 25 September 1964
- Preceded by: Constituency created
- Succeeded by: James Johnson

Member of Parliament for Kingston upon Hull Central
- In office 5 July 1945 – 6 May 1955
- Preceded by: Walter Windsor
- Succeeded by: Constituency abolished

Personal details
- Born: 15 December 1897 Consett, County Durham
- Died: 27 February 1973 (aged 75)
- Party: Labour

Captain Mark Hewitson (15 December 1897 – 27 February 1973) was a British trade union official and Labour Party politician. He was chosen at the last minute to stand for Parliament, and eventually served as a Member of Parliament (MP) for nineteen years. He was described as a member of the 'old school' of trade union leaders, and proud of it.

== First World War ==
Hewitson was born in Consett, County Durham where he went to the local council school. He was a convinced socialist and joined the Labour Party in 1914. Later that year, he joined the Northumberland Fusiliers, and went to fight in the First World War. From 1916 he was in the West Yorkshire Regiment until his discharge in 1920.

== Trade Union activities ==
In 1927 Hewitson became a trade union official with the General and Municipal Workers' Union in the north-east of England. He was based in Newcastle upon Tyne, and was an area organiser. He was elected to Durham County Council in 1930. From 1937, Hewitson was President of the International Trade Secretariat for the Public and Civil Service, a post which involved many visits to continental Europe where he became well known. Hewitson served on the National Executive Committee of the Labour Party in 1939–40.

== Second World War ==
After the outbreak of the Second World War, Hewitson was one of the first national trade union leaders to leave some of his posts and volunteer to serve in the armed forces. He was commissioned into the Auxiliary Military Pioneer Corps in 1940, but resigned his commission due to ill health in 1941, by which time he was a Captain. Subsequently, he became chief industrial officer for his union, and was involved in preventing unlawful strikes: in October 1944 he protested against a dockers' strike in Newcastle, saying that the dockers were now out of hand and the union was no longer responsible for their actions. He was elected to a five-year term as President of the International Federation of General Factory Workers in 1945.

== Member of Parliament ==
During the 1945 general election campaign on 29 June 1945, the sitting Labour MP for Kingston upon Hull Central Walter Windsor died. Polling was postponed to allow the party time to choose its replacement, and on 5 July Hewitson was chosen. In the last result of the election, he easily held the seat. Later, questions were raised about his election due to his membership of trade boards appointed by the Minister of Labour; however, the Select Committee on Elections reported that they were not offices "of profit" and so did not invalidate his election.

Hewitson was again elected to the Labour Party National Executive Committee from 1947 to 1953, nominated in the section for trade unions. He remained involved in his union and spoke to the Trade Union Congress in 1949 calling for the TUC to withdraw from the World Federation of Trade Unions, which was communist-dominated. At the 1950 general election, Hewitson defeated his Conservative opponent R.D. Wilberforce, a descendant of William Wilberforce who had been Member of Parliament for Hull when he began his famous campaign against slavery.

== Anti-Bevanism ==
During the Bevanite campaign of the early 1950s, Hewitson supported the leadership. He made a speech in his constituency in August 1952 insisting that differences of opinion within the Labour Party "did not require the existence of private and conspiratorial groups". In 1953 he was replaced as GMWU candidate for the National Executive Committee, and ran instead in the constituency parties section, but came bottom of the poll. In 1954, Hewitson "talked out" a Private Member's Bill introduced by Frederick Mulley which called for publication of football pools promoters' accounts.

After boundary changes, Hewitson was returned for Kingston upon Hull West. Representing many fishermen, he moved a motion in Parliament to stop a proposed doubling in the levy for the White Fish Authority in September 1956.

== Retirement ==
In April 1960 Hewitson announced that he would not fight the next election, on medical advice. He was involved in a scandal in March 1964 when a girl from South Shields who was working as a club hostess in London claimed that Hewitson, who was a club regular, had given her money and made advances on her after inviting her to his flat. She had pleaded guilty to theft of cheque books from his flat.

Hewitson left Parliament, and retired as National Industrial Officer for the General and Municipal Workers' Union, in October 1964.

Parliament of the United Kingdom
Preceded by Walter Windsor	Member of Parliament for Kingston upon Hull Central; 1945–1955	Constituency abolished
New constituency	Member of Parliament for Kingston upon Hull West; 1955–1964	Succeeded by James Johnson
Trade union offices
Preceded by Charles Dukes	President of the International Federation of Employees in Public and Civil Services; 1937–1938	Succeeded by Tom Williamson
Preceded by Robert Nielsen	President of the International Federation of General Factory Workers; 1945–1950	Succeeded by Carl F. Lindahl
