= Stephen Eyton =

English chronicler

Stephen Eyton or Edon (fl. 1320?), was an English chronicler.

Eyton was a canon of the Augustinian priory of Warter, near Pocklington in the East Riding of Yorkshire. His name may derive from the nearby village of Etton. He wrote a work entitled Acta Edwardi II ("The Acts of Edward II"), whose opening words were Post mortem toti mundo deflendam ("After the death of the whole world, bewail"). John Leland found a copy in the library of Fountains Abbey, but it has not since been identified.
