= Richard Middleton (political agent) =

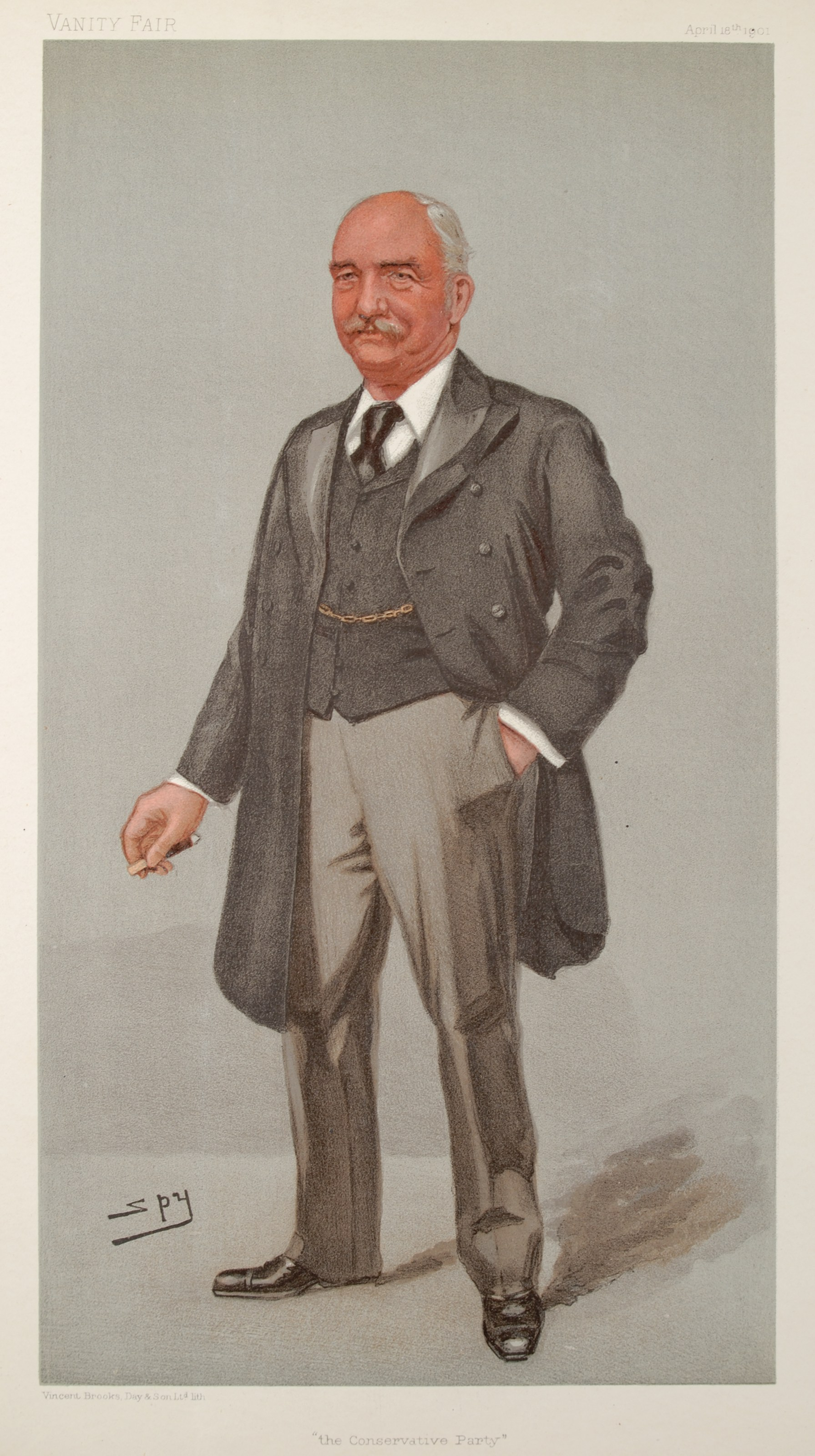
Caricature in Vanity Fair, 18 April 1901.

Richard William Evelyn Middleton (16 February 1846 – 26 February 1905), was an English political agent for the Conservative Party.

== Early life ==
Middleton was the son of Alexander Middleton and Elizabeth Middleton (née Neave) and a great-grandnephew of Charles Middleton, 1st Baron Barham. He entered the Royal Navy in 1860, being promoted to navigating lieutenant in 1873. He married Emily Florence in 1877 and they had five sons and two daughters.

== Political agent ==
In 1882 he was appointed honorary secretary of a Conservative club, the Point House Club in Blackheath. The year after he became Conservative agent for the constituency of West Kent.

The Corrupt Practices Act 1883, Reform Act 1884 and the Redistribution of Seats Act 1885 had greatly affected the electoral make-up of the country and Middleton's success in mastering them ensured that he was appointed the Conservatives' principal agent, succeeding George Trout Bartley. He held this post until July 1903.

Middleton openly admitted the political benefits for the Conservatives when the Liberals adopted unpopular policies; he said he was "grateful" when Gladstone adopted Irish Home Rule; grateful again when Gladstone adopted the Newcastle Programme in 1891 and "deeply grateful" when the Liberals attacked the House of Lords and adopted the local veto on liquor licences. After an appeal to Conservative workers made by Lord Salisbury and Arthur Balfour, in March 1896 Middleton was presented at the Constitutional Club with a cheque for £10,000 and a silver casket for his services to the party. At the ceremony, Salisbury paid tribute to Middleton.

== Legacy ==
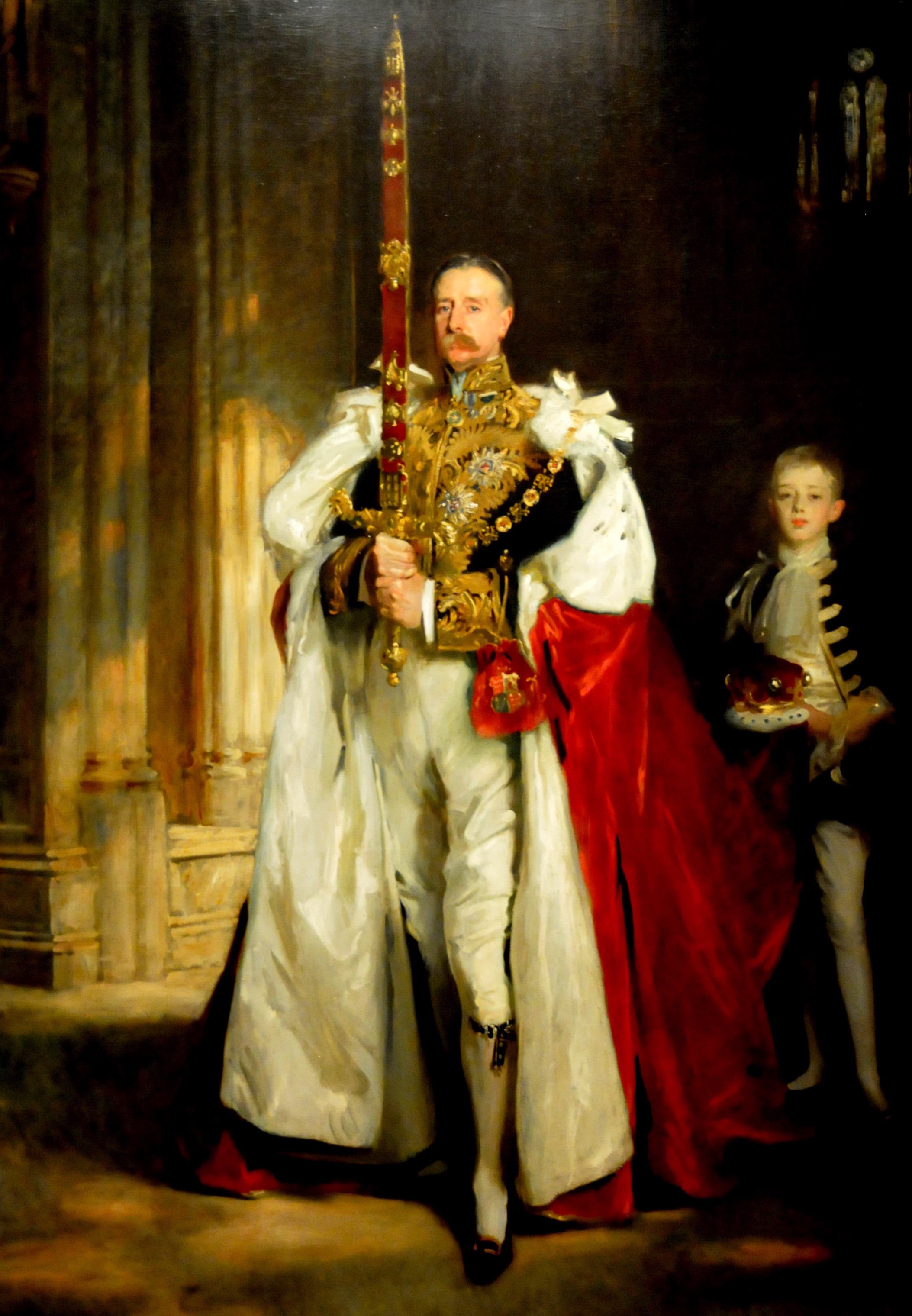
Lord Londonderry praised Middleton as the architect of the Conservative victory in the 1895 general election

The historian Richard Shannon assessed Middleton's contribution to the Conservatives:

It was Middleton's skill as an electioneering manager to optimize the prevailing benefits available to the Conservative Party. ... He shrewdly kept fences well mended with the police and the drink trade, and solicitously cultivated the ‘new journalism’ represented most famously by the Harmsworths and the Daily Mail. ... The reputation of Middleton and Central Office...was ‘made’ by the greater achievement in 1895 of gaining a small but telling overall Conservative majority within the Unionist coalition. Lord Londonderry hailed Middleton on behalf of the National Union as the ‘brilliant agent’, who had done ‘more than anybody else to secure the great victory we have achieved’. ... With the unprecedented ‘double’ of Unionist triumph in the ‘khaki’ election of 1900...Middleton's reputation attained its ultimate lustre.

== Notes ==
Party political offices
Preceded by George Trout Bartley	Principal Agent of the Conservative Party; 1885 – 1903	Succeeded by Lionel de Lautour Wells
