= Battle of Wami =

- Part of East African Campaign
Date	August 1916
Location	Near Wami River, German East Africa (modern Tanzania)

The Battle of Wami was fought on 17 August 1916 during the East African Campaign of World War I, near the Wami River in present-day Tanzania.
