= Western General Hospital, Kingston upon Hull =

Hospital in Kingston upon Hull, East Riding of Yorkshire, England

Western General Hospital
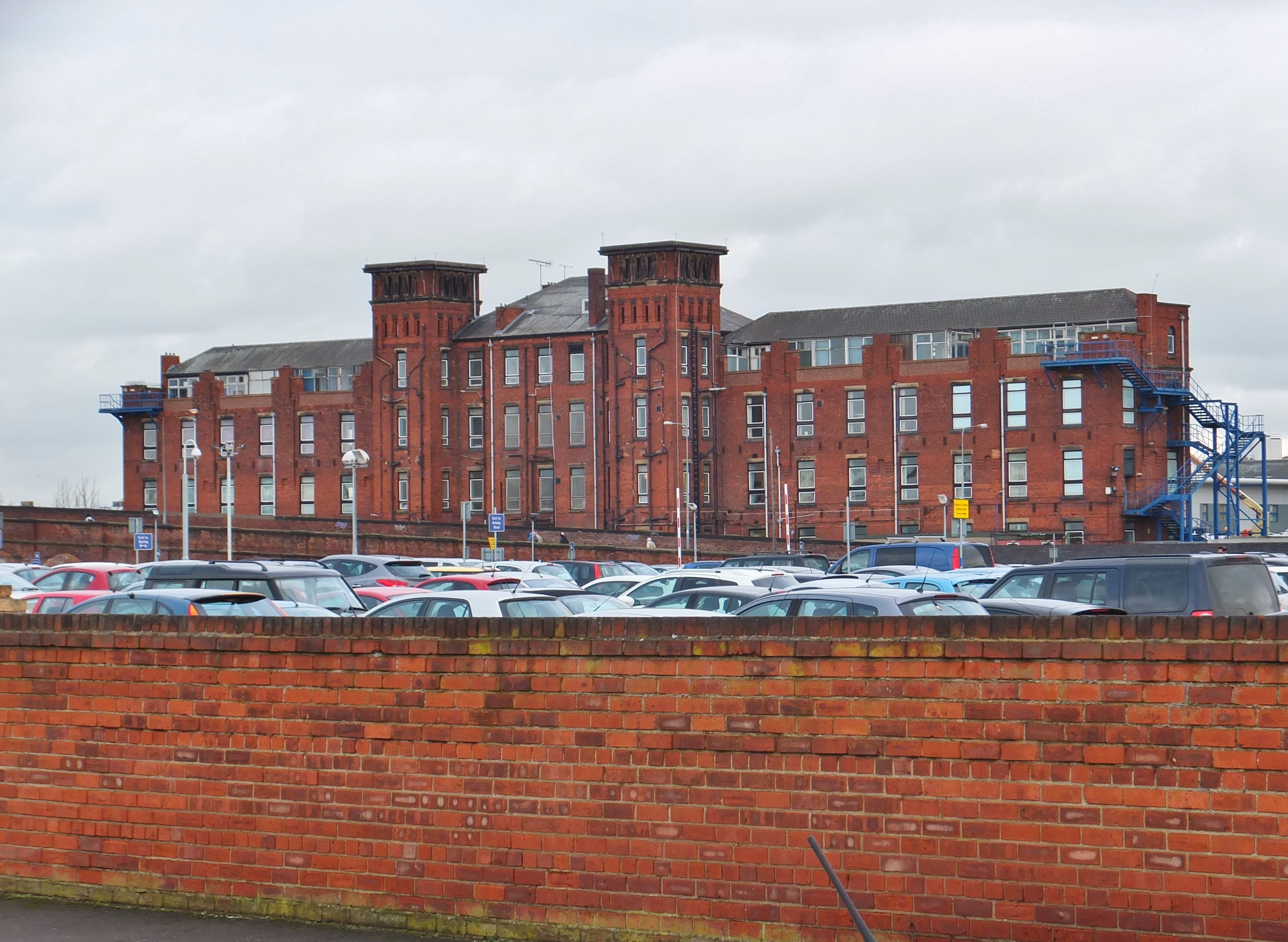
- The former Western General Hospital

- Shown in the East Riding of Yorkshire

Geography
- Location: Kingston upon Hull, East Riding of Yorkshire, England
- Coordinates: 53.7451°N 0.3589°W

Organisation
- Care system: NHS
- Type: District General

Services
- Emergency department: Yes

History
- Founded: 1914
- Closed: 1966

Links
- Lists: Hospitals in England

The Western General Hospital was an acute general hospital in Kingston upon Hull, England.

== History ==
The hospital has its origins in the Anlaby Road Institution Infirmary which was built between 1912 and 1914 to serve the sick from the local workhouse. During the First World War, the hospital was expanded to receive casualties from the Western Front who had arrived, often badly wounded, at Paragon Station. It became a naval hospital for injured sailors in April 1917.

It joined the National Health Service as the Western General Hospital in 1948 and, after services transferred to the Hull Royal Infirmary, it closed in 1966. The building, which became known as the Haughton Building, continued to be used by the Hull Royal Infirmary for storage purposes until it was demolished to make way for a helipad in 2017.
