= George Trout Bartley =

British politician

Bartley in 1895.

Sir George Christopher Trout Bartley, KCB (22 November 1842 – 13 September 1910) was an English civil servant, banker and Conservative politician who sat in the House of Commons from 1885 to 1906.

== Biography ==
Bartley was born at Stoke Newington, the son of Robert Bartley and his wife Julia Anne Lucas. He was educated at Clapton, London and University College School. He entered public service and worked for twenty years at the Science and Art Department, becoming Assistant Director. He was interested in poverty and social issues and published works on education and on building self-reliance He supported technical education, and was treasurer of the Society of Arts. He established a penny bank, which became the National Penny Bank. He was a J.P. for Middlesex and Westminster.

Trout Bartley stood for parliament in Hackney at the 1880 general election, but was unsuccessful. He was elected as member of parliament (MP) for Islington North at the 1885 general election and held the seat until his defeat in 1906. He announced that he would stand again when a suitable opportunity arose, and contested the Kingston upon Hull West by-election in November 1907. The intervention for the first time of a Labour Party candidate cut the Liberal majority, but not by enough for Bartley to win the seat, and after his defeat in Hull he did not stand for Parliament again.

He was a member of the Traffic Commission and travelled extensively. He was in South Africa when the Second Boer War broke out in 1899.

He was appointed a Knight Commander of the Order of the Bath (KCB) in the November 1902 Birthday Honours list, and was invested with the insignia by King Edward VII at Buckingham Palace on 18 December 1902.

== Family ==
In 1864, Bartley married Mary Charlotte Cole the daughter of Henry Cole superintendent of the Science and Art Department. They had four sons. Their son Captain Stanhope Cole Bartley Royal Artillery was KIA 12/03/1916.

== Publications ==
- A Square Mile in the East End 1870
- Schools for the people 1871
- Provident Knowledge Papers 1872
- The Seven Ages of a Village Pauper 1874
- The Parish Net, How it is Dragged and what it Catches 1875
- Enthusiasm 1888

Parliament of the United Kingdom
New constituency	Member of Parliament for Islington North; 1885–1906	Succeeded by David Sydney Waterlow
Party political offices
Preceded by John Eldon Gorst	Principal Agent of the Conservative Party; 1883–1885	Succeeded by Richard Middleton
