= James Johnson (British politician) =

British Labour Party politician and Member of Parliament

James Johnson (16 September 1908 – 31 January 1995) was a British Labour Party politician and Member of Parliament (MP).

He was born to the family of a Northumberland miner and was educated at Duke's School, Alnwick, and Leeds University. He played football for the English Universities XI and the Corinthians. Johnson was a lecturer in social studies at Coventry Technical College and an official for the National Union of General and Municipal Workers in Kenya. He served as a councillor on Coventry City Council.

Johnson was first elected to the House of Commons at the 1950 general election, as MP for Rugby. He was re-elected at the 1951 and 1955 elections, but at the 1959 general election, he lost his seat to the Conservative Party candidate Roy Wise by a margin of only 470 votes.

He returned to Parliament five years later, at the 1964 general election, when he succeeded Mark Hewitson in the safe Labour seat of Kingston upon Hull West. He retired at the 1983 general election, when his seat was held for Labour by Stuart Randall.

Johnson never reached ministerial office, but he served as a parliamentary private secretary from 1964 to 66.

Parliament of the United Kingdom
Preceded by William Brown	Member of Parliament for Rugby; 1950–1959	Succeeded by Roy Wise
Preceded by Mark Hewitson	Member of Parliament for Kingston upon Hull West; 1964–1983	Succeeded by Stuart Randall
