= Stuart Randall, Baron Randall of St Budeaux =

British politician (1938–2012)

The Right Honourable The Lord Randall of St Budeaux

Member of Parliament for Kingston upon Hull West
- In office 9 June 1983 – 8 April 1997
- Preceded by: James Johnson
- Succeeded by: Constituency abolished Alan Johnson (as Member of Parliament for Kingston upon Hull West and Hessle)

Member of the House of Lords
- Lord Temporal
- Life peerage 25 September 1997 – 11 August 2012

Personal details
- Born: 22 June 1938 Plymouth, South West England
- Died: 11 August 2012 (aged 74)
- Party: Labour
- Education: University College, Cardiff

Stuart Jeffrey Randall, Baron Randall of St Budeaux (22 June 1938 – 11 August 2012) was a British Labour Party politician who was Member of Parliament (MP) for Kingston upon Hull West from 1983 until he stood down in 1997.

== Biography ==
Born in Plymouth, Randall was educated locally and worked as a fitter in the city's dockyards. He gained a BSc degree in Electrical Engineering from University College, Cardiff and worked in the electronics industry for twenty years. He joined the Labour Party in 1966 and contested South Worcestershire at the October 1974 general election and Midlands West at the 1979 European election before being elected as MP for Kingston upon Hull West in 1983. He served as parliamentary private secretary to Deputy Leader of the Labour Party Roy Hattersley and as opposition spokesman on Agriculture and Fisheries and Home Affairs.

After his retirement from the House of Commons, he was made a life peer as Baron Randall of St Budeaux, of St Budeaux in the County of Devon. During the public debate over the House of Lords Act 1999, Lord Randall opposed the removal of the vast majority of hereditary peers as proposed by the Labour Party, saying that many such peers were "terrific people who contribute massively to the British parliament" and that "to wipe them out overnight is not only unacceptable in humanitarian terms but would degrade Parliament". Randall also opined that "I am 500% more efficient as a real politician in the Lords, but there is an ignorance level in the Commons about the Lords and [MPs] don't know what goes on there." As an alternative to Labour's proposals, Randall suggested that all the hereditary peers at that time could be allowed to remain in the House of Lords, but that their offspring should be disqualified from inheriting their seats in that chamber. Randall's proposition was rejected, and the House of Lords Act 1999 was passed as devised by the Labour government.

Parliament of the United Kingdom
Preceded by James Johnson	Member of Parliament for Kingston upon Hull West; 1983–1997	Constituency abolished
