= Warter =

Village and civil parish in the East Riding of Yorkshire, England

Coordinates: 53.941027°N 0.679672°W

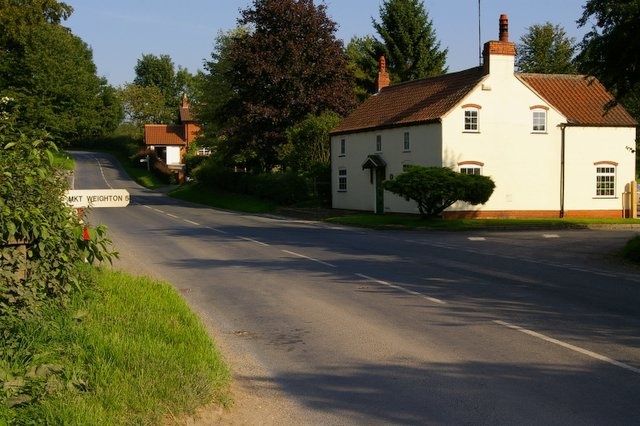
- The B1246 road through Warter

- Location within the East Riding of Yorkshire
- Population: 144 (2011 census)
- OS grid reference: SE867502
- Civil parish: Warter
- Unitary authority: East Riding of Yorkshire
- Ceremonial county: East Riding of Yorkshire
- Region: Yorkshire and the Humber
- Country: England
- Sovereign state: United Kingdom
- Post town: YORK
- Postcode district: YO42
- Dialling code: 01759
- Police: Humberside
- Fire: Humberside
- Ambulance: Yorkshire
- UK Parliament: Bridlington and The Wolds

Warter is a small village and civil parish in the East Riding of Yorkshire, England. It is situated approximately 4 miles (6.4 km) east of Pocklington on the B1246 road and 18 miles (29 km) from the city of York.

According to the 2011 UK census, Warter parish had a population of 144, a reduction on the 2001 UK census figure of 159.

The name Warter probably derives from the Old English weargtrēow meaning 'the tree of the felon'. Alternatively, it may derive from wearrtrēow meaning 'callused tree'.

It is the location for Warter Priory, which was an Augustinian Priory dedicated to St James founded in 1132 by Geoffrey Fitz-Pain. The chronicler Stephen Eyton was a canon there. It was dissolved in 1536 by the dissolution under King Henry VIII. The site of this priory is now a scheduled monument to the north of St James' Church.

The dimensions of St James' Church, cloister, other buildings and the shape of their roofs were recorded along with details of the vestments and church plate. The church was 40 by 12 yards with a quire of 28 by 9 yards; the cloister 96 yards in circuit and 4 yards in breadth. The parish church of St James was designated a Grade II listed building in January 1967 and is now recorded in the National Heritage List for England, maintained by Historic England.

A coppice near the village was the inspiration for the landscape painting Bigger Trees Near Warter by David Hockney.

== Education ==
Warter has a primary school located on Addlekeld, the main street through Warter. The school is called Warter Church of England Primary School and most of its pupils transfer after Year 6 to Woldgate College in Pocklington.

== Transport ==
Warter is served by buses operated by East Yorkshire Motor Services.

== See also ==
- Listed buildings in Warter

== Gallery ==
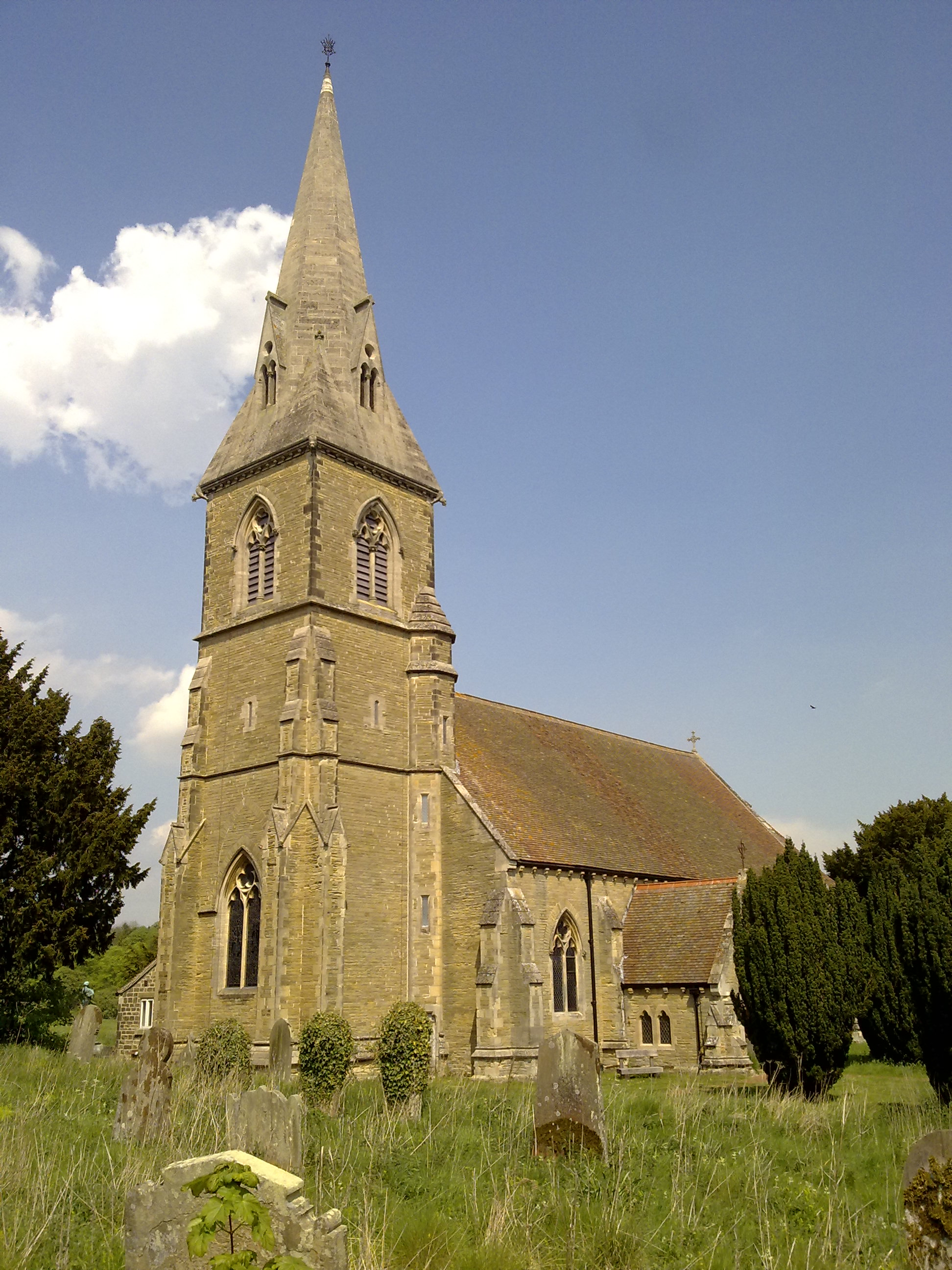
St James Church

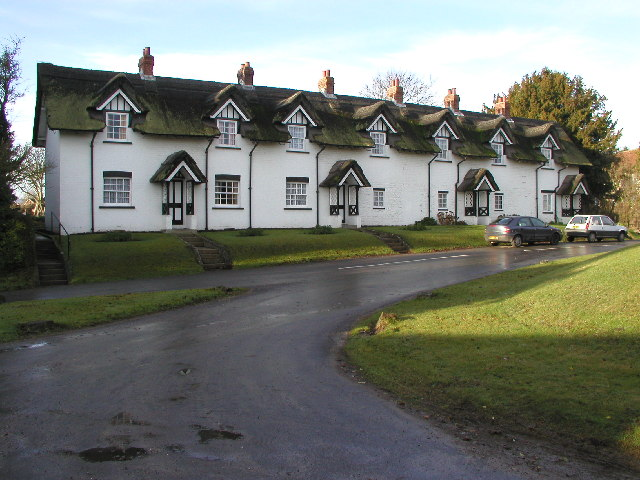
Cottages at Warter

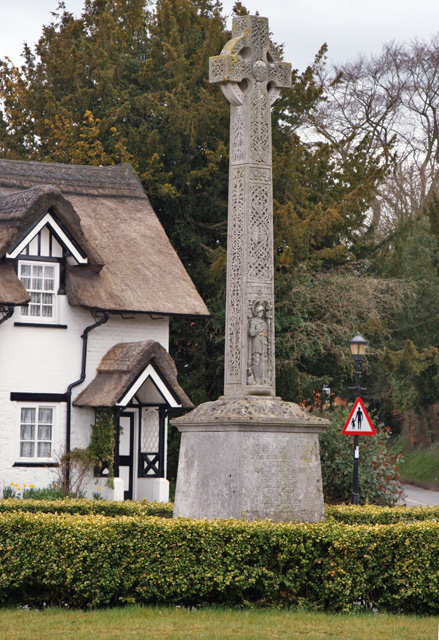
Warter War Memorial
