= Charles Wilson, 1st Baron Nunburnholme =

British politician

The Right Honourable The Lord Nunburnholme JP DL
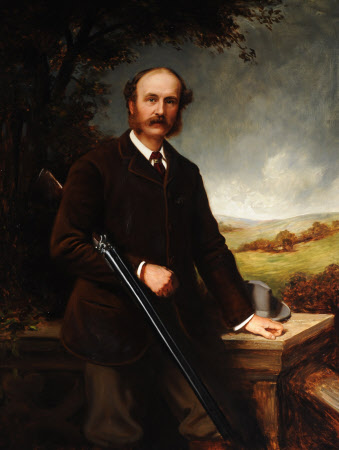

Member of the House of Lords
- Lord Temporal
- In office 5 February 1906 – 21 October 1907
- Preceded by: Peerage created
- Succeeded by: The 2nd Baron Nunburnholme

Member of Parliament for Hull and Hull West
- In office 1874–1906
- Preceded by: Joseph Walker Pease; Charles Morgan Norwood
- Succeeded by: Charles Wilson

Personal details
- Born: Charles Henry Wilson; 22 April 1833 Hull, Yorkshire, England
- Died: 21 October 1907 (aged 74) Warter, Pocklington, Yorkshire, England
- Spouse: Florence Wellesley (m. 1871)

Charles Henry Wilson, 1st Baron Nunburnholme (22 April 1833 – 21 October 1907), was a prominent English shipowner who became head of the Thomas Wilson Sons & Co. shipping business.

Together with his brother he expanded the activities of the company, into one of the largest in Britain. He also served as Liberal MP for Hull for thirty years, and in 1906 received the title Baron Nunburnholme.

== Life ==
Charles Wilson c. 1895

Charles was the son of Thomas Wilson, the head of Thomas Wilson Sons & Co., a Hull shipping company founded in the Swedish ore trade. He was educated at Kingston College in Hull, along with his brother Arthur, before eventually joining the family business, where they both became joint managers in 1867.

Under the brothers' management the shipping company rapidly expanded adding Adriatic, Sicilian, American and Indian services to the pre-existing Norwegian and Baltic trade. In 1891 the company became a private limited company, with capital of £2.5 million, and expanded with the acquisition of Bailey and Leetham (Hull) in 1903; and the shipping interests of the North Eastern Railway in 1908. Wilson also became chairman of Earle's Shipbuilding, the United Shipping Company and the Hull Steam Fish and Ice Company.

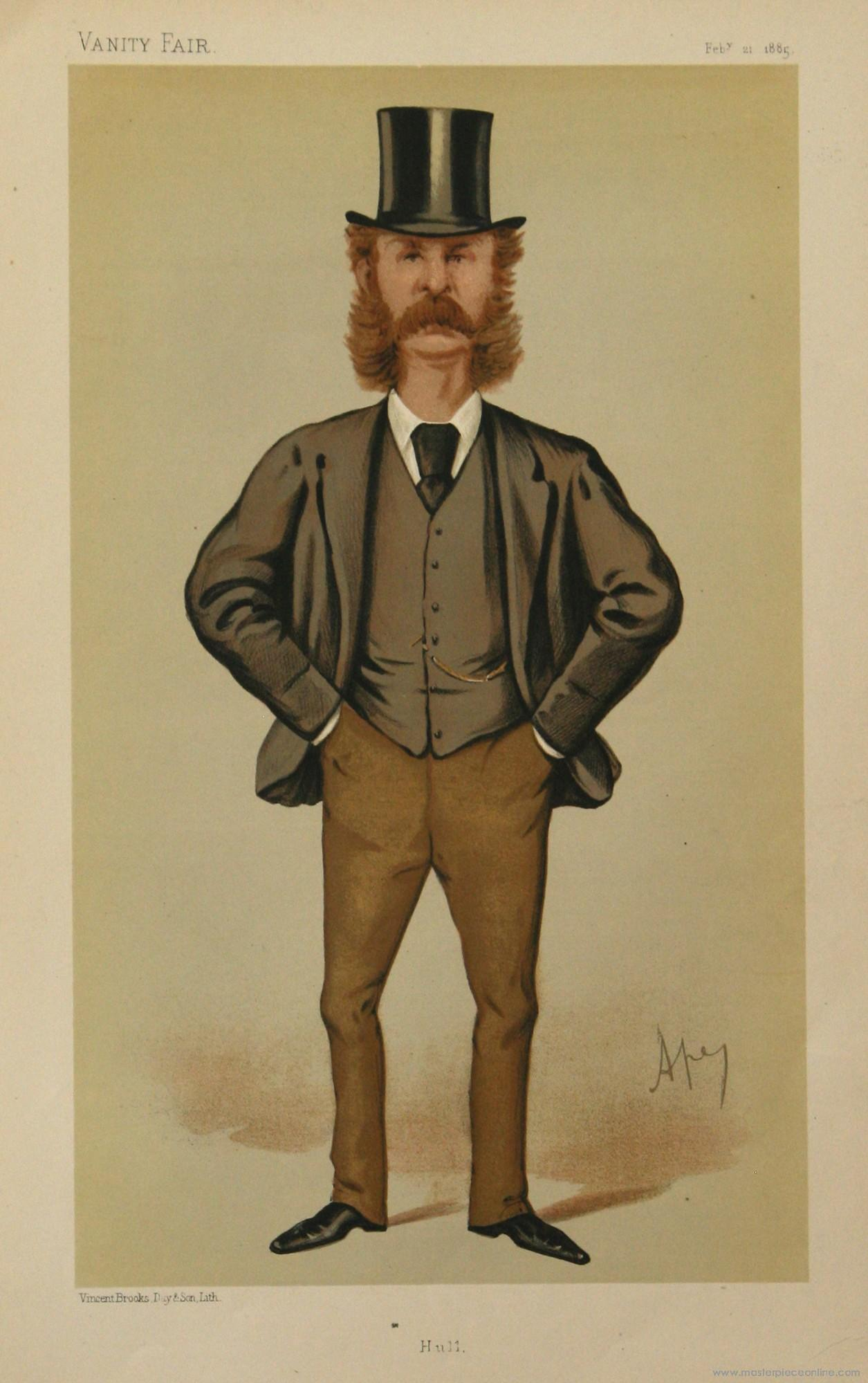
"Hull". Caricature by "Ape" published in Vanity Fair in 1885.

Wilson served as high sheriff of Hull, and from 1874 to 1905 he was Liberal Member of Parliament (MP) for the Hull constituency, from 1885 representing Hull West. Although opposed to the Boer War, he lent the company's finest vessel, Ariosto, at the government's disposal.

He was given the Freedom of the City of Hull in 1899, and in 1906 he was raised to the peerage as Baron Nunburnholme, of the City of Kingston upon Hull.

Lord Nunburnholme died at his residence, Warter Priory, Warter, Pocklington, East Riding of Yorkshire, on 21 October 1907 and was buried on 31 October. His eldest son Charles, who had succeeded him as MP for Hull West, inherited the Barony.

== Family ==
Wilson married Florence Jane Helen Wellesley (1853–1932), a daughter of Col. William Henry Charles Wellesley, nephew of Arthur Wellesley, 1st Duke of Wellington. They had seven children.

=== Issue ===
	Life span	Marriage(s)	Notes
by Florence Jane Helen Wellesley
Hon. Millicent Florence Eleanor Wilson	1872–1952	Married, firstly, Charles Cradock-Hartopp, 5th Baronet, son of John Cradock-Hartopp, 4th Baronet, and Charlotte Howard; no issue. They divorced in 1905.	
Hon. Millicent Florence Eleanor Wilson	1872–1952	Married, secondly, Henry Wellesley, 3rd Earl Cowley, son of William Wellesley, 2nd Earl Cowley, and Emily Williams; had issue. They divorced in 1913.	
Hon. Millicent Florence Eleanor Wilson	1872–1952	Married, thirdly, Major Grey Duberly, son of William Duberly and the Hon. Rosa Sandys; no issue.	Major Duberly was killed in action in World War I in 1915.
Hon. Charles Henry Wellesley Wilson	1875–1924	Married Lady Marjorie Wynn-Carington, daughter of Charles Wynn-Carington, 1st Earl Carrington, and the Hon. Cecilia Harbord; had issue.	
Colonel Hon. Guy Wilson	1877–1943	Married, firstly, Lady Isabel Innes-Ker, daughter of James Innes-Ker, 7th Duke of Roxburghe, and Lady Anne Spencer-Churchill.	Lady Isabel died in childbirth in 1905, the year after their marriage.
Colonel Hon. Guy Wilson	1877–1943	Married, secondly, Avery Buxton, daughter of Lt.Col. Geoffrey Buxton and Mary Harbord; had issue.	
Hon. Enid Edith Wilson	1878–1957	Married Edwyn Scudamore-Stanhope, 10th Earl of Chesterfield, son of Henry Scudamore-Stanhope, 9th Earl of Chesterfield, and Dorothea Hay; no issue.	
Hon. Joan Evelyn Jane Wilson	1880–1960	Married Guy Fairfax, son of Lt.Col. Thomas Fairfax and Evelyn Milner; had issue.	
Hon. Gwladys Alice Gertrude Wilson	1881–1971	Married Hon. Eric Chaplin, son of Henry Chaplin, 1st Viscount Chaplin, and Lady Florence Sutherland-Leveson-Gower, and later 2nd Viscount Chaplin; had issue.	
Hon. Gerald Valerian Wilson	1885–1908		

Parliament of the United Kingdom
Preceded by Joseph Walker Pease; Charles Morgan Norwood	Member of Parliament for Hull; 1874–1885; With: Charles Morgan Norwood	Constituency abolished
New constituency	Member of Parliament for Hull West; 1885–1906	Succeeded by Hon. Charles Wilson
Peerage of the United Kingdom
New creation	Baron Nunburnholme; 1906–1907; Member of the House of Lords (1906–1907)	Succeeded by Charles Wilson
