= James Holmes (trade unionist) =

British trade unionist and political activist

Holmes, in about 1910

James Headgoose Holmes (19 March 1861 – 1 October 1934) was a British trade unionist and political activist.

Born in Frampton, Lincolnshire, Holmes left education at the age of nine to work on a farm, and at the age of eleven, briefly became a sailor. He then returned to farm labour in Lincolnshire, but lost his job when he tried to organise a strike. In 1882, he gained work with the Great Northern Railway Company in Spalding, and he quickly rose within the company to become a signalman in Retford.

Holmes joined the Amalgamated Society of Railway Servants in the early 1880s, but did not become active in the union until around 1890, when he was president of the Retford branch. He was also active in the Liberal Party and the Labour Electoral Association, supporting J. T. Yoxall at the 1892 general election in Bassetlaw. Soon after the election, he admitted breaching railway regulations and his employer decided to downgrade him. He refused offers of less senior posts and was instead sacked. He sued the company for wages for a period in which he had been suspended, but lost the case. The ASRS supported him, and although he found work at the Singer Sewing Machine Company in Doncaster, he remained active in his old union.

In 1896, Holmes stood unsuccessfully for Doncaster Town Council as a Lib-Lab candidate. He became a full-time organiser for the ASRS in 1898 in Wales and Western England, but he found it difficult to work with the union's new general secretary, Richard Bell, who tried to dismiss Holmes after his involvement in the Taff Vale Case in which damages were awarded against the ASRS. Holmes retained his position on a vote of members, but was censured, and in 1906 moved back to Doncaster to organise in northern England, where he remained for the rest of his career, staying post when the ASRS became the National Union of Railwaymen.

Holmes stood for the Labour Representation Committee in Birmingham East at the 1906 general election, taking 47.4% of the vote and narrowly missing out on election. He then stood in the 1907 Kingston-upon-Hull West by-election for the renamed Labour Party, where he took third place with 29.1%, then finally he contested the 1912 Crewe by-election, where he took only 17.7%.

Holmes was strongly supportive of Britain's role in World War I and spoke at recruitment meetings, although he opposed conscription. He left the Labour Party and, although he was active in supporting the railway strike of 1919, he was keen to emphasis his opposition to Bolshevism. He retired in 1922 and died twelve years later.
