= Baron Nunburnholme =

Barony in the Peerage of the United Kingdom

Barony of Nurnburnholme
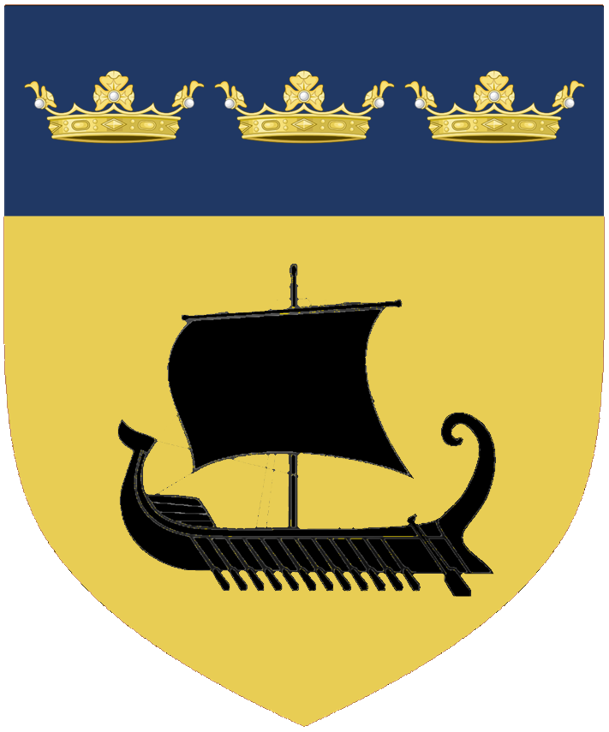
- Or an Ancient Ship Sable on a Chief Azure three Ducal Coronets of the first
- Creation date: 16 January 1906
- Created by: King Edward VII
- Peerage: Peerage of the United Kingdom
- First holder: Charles Wilson, 1st Baron Nunburnholme
- Present holder: Stephen Wilson, 6th Baron Nunburnholme
- Heir apparent: The Hon. Charles Wilson
- Remainder to: Heirs male of the first baron's body, lawfully begotten
- Motto: Pro Legibus Ac Regibus (For laws and kings)

Baron Nunburnholme, of the City of Kingston-upon-Hull, is a title in the Peerage of the United Kingdom. It was created in 1906 for the former Liberal Member of Parliament for Hull and Hull West, Charles Wilson. His son, the second Baron, also represented Hull West in Parliament as a Liberal and served as Lord Lieutenant of the East Riding of Yorkshire between 1908 and 1924. The title descended from father to son until the death of the second Baron's grandson, the fourth Baron, in 1999. The late Baron was succeeded by his younger brother, the fifth Baron. Since 2000, the title has been held by the latter's son, the sixth Baron.

== Baron Nunburnholme (1906) ==
- Charles Henry Wilson, 1st Baron Nunburnholme (1833–1907)
- Charles Henry Wellesley Wilson, 2nd Baron Nunburnholme (1875–1924)
- Charles John Wilson, 3rd Baron Nunburnholme (1904–1974)
- Ben Charles Wilson, 4th Baron Nunburnholme (1928–1998)
- Charles Thomas Wilson, 5th Baron Nunburnholme (1935–2000)
- Stephen Charles Yanath Wilson, 6th Baron Nunburnholme (b. 1973)

The heir apparent is the present holder's son, the Hon. Charles Taiyo Christobal Wilson (b. 2002).

=== Title succession chart ===
Title succession chart, Barons Nunburnholme.

Charles Wilson; 1st Baron Nunburnholme; 1833–1907
Charles Wilson; 2nd Baron Nunburnholme; 1875–1924
Charles Wilson; 3rd Baron Nunburnholme; 1904–1974
Ben Wilson; 4th Baron Nunburnholme; 1928–1998	Charles Wilson; 5th Baron Nunburnholme; 1935–2000
Stephen Wilson; 6th Baron Nunburnholme born 1973
Hon. Charles Wilson born 2002
