= East Anglian (Essex) Heavy Battery, Royal Garrison Artillery =

East Anglian (Essex) Heavy Battery, RGA
- Royal Artillery cap badge
- Active: 6 July 1908–11 October 1919
- Country: United Kingdom
- Branch: Territorial Force
- Role: Heavy Artillery
- Part of: Royal Garrison Artillery
- Garrison/HQ: Artillery House, Stratford Green
- Engagements: Battle of Vimy Ridge; Battle of Passchendaele; Battle of the Lys; Battle of Amiens; Battle of Épehy; Battle of the St Quentin Canal; Battle of the Selle; Battle of the Sambre

The East Anglian (Essex) Heavy Battery, Royal Garrison Artillery was a part-time unit of Britain's Territorial Force formed in 1908 from part of an existing Essex volunteer artillery unit. It fought on the Western Front during World War I, at the Battles of Vimy Ridge and Passchendaele, during the German Spring Offensive, and at the Battles of Amiens, Épehy, the St Quentin Canal, the Selle and the Sambre. It was merged into a medium artillery unit from Suffolk in the postwar Territorial Army.

== Origin ==
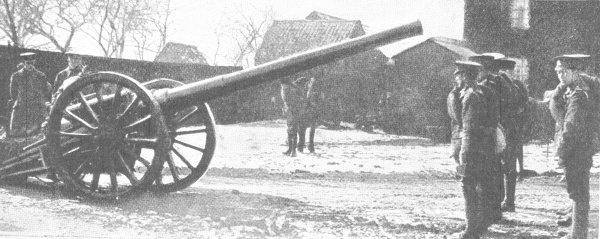
Training on a 4.7-inch gun, ca 1914.

When the Territorial Force (TF) was created in 1908 by the Haldane Reforms, each of the new force's infantry divisions was allocated a heavy battery of the Royal Garrison Artillery (RGA). The East Anglian Division was provided with a battery formed from part of the 1st Essex Royal Garrison Artillery (Volunteers). While the bulk of the Essex artillery volunteers from the London suburbs transferred to the Royal Field Artillery as the 2nd East Anglian Brigade, the East Anglian (Essex) Heavy Battery remained with the RGA. Both units continued to share a headquarters at Artillery House, Stratford Green.

The new heavy battery was officially formed on 6 July 1908 and gained its 'Essex' subtitle in March 1909. It was armed with four 4.7-inch guns, together with a dedicated ammunition column.

== World War I ==
=== Mobilisation ===
The East Anglian Division began its annual training on 27 July 1914, with the divisional artillery travelling to Redesdale Training Area in Northumberland. When the order to mobilise was given on 4 August, the units had to return to their headquarters by train and then move to their war stations. The battery mobilised at Stratford under the command of Major S.E. Wood. By 10 August the division had concentrated around Brentwood, Essex, and on 20 August it moved to Chelmsford and formed part of the coast defences of the UK.

On the outbreak of war, TF units were invited to volunteer for Overseas Service. On 15 August 1914, the War Office issued instructions to separate those men who had signed up for Home Service only, and form these into reserve units, and on 31 August, the formation of a reserve or 2nd Line unit was authorised for each 1st Line unit where 60 per cent or more of the men had volunteered for Overseas Service. The titles of these 2nd Line units would be the same as the original, but distinguished by a '2/' prefix. In this way duplicate units were created, mirroring those being sent overseas. The parent battery was designated 1/1st East Anglian (Essex) Heavy Battery (usually referred to simply as '1/1st Essex') and the new unit recruiting at Stratford became the 2/1st Battery.

=== 1/1st East Anglian (Essex) Heavy Battery ===
The 1st East Anglian Division was employed on coast defence until May 1915, when it was concentrated at St Albans preparatory to going overseas as the 54th (1st East Anglian) Division. However, when the infantry departed for the Gallipoli Campaign, the divisional artillery was left behind in England. In July 1915 it was attached to the 2nd East Anglian Division at Thetford (which became the 69th (2nd East Anglian) Division in August). Although the 54th (EA) Divisional field artillery went out to the Western Front in November 1915 and later rejoined its division in the Middle East, 1/1st Essex Hvy Bty remained with the 69th (2nd EA) Division, where it was joined by the 2/1st Essex Hvy Bty from Stratford.

1/1st Essex Hvy Bty left 69th (2nd EA) Division on 1 March 1916 to mobilise for overseas service. It disembarked at Le Havre on 14 March and two days later it joined XVII Corps Heavy Artillery (HA) on the Western Front. It was assigned to 23rd Heavy Artillery Group (HAG) on 20 March.

==== Vimy Ridge ====
XVII Corps was in the process of taking over the northern sector of Third Army's front. The sector was largely quiet except in the Vimy Ridge area, where there was constant Trench warfare and Mine warfare, including a serious German attack on 21 May. In June the battery transferred to the command of 50th (South African) HAG in the same sector. Positioned at Marœuil it was engaged in counter-battery (CB) fire, and was targeted in turn by hostile batteries: on 7 July it was heavily bombarded by 8-inch armour-piercing shells, which destroyed an unoccupied gun position. After being shelled again on 8 July the battery moved into positions previously occupied by 1/1st Wessex Heavy Bty, before returning later in the month. It carried out test firing of Shrapnel shells with two new fuzes: these were unsatisfactory, with numerous premature shell burst, and further tests had to be carried out in the autumn. The gunners spent much of the summer constructing gun positions for other units of XVII Corps HA, and sending its worn-out guns to workshops for replacement.

In December 1916 the WO decided that all heavy batteries should be composed of six modern 60-pounder guns. On 28 December 1916 the battery finally handed in its old 4.7-inch guns and received four 60-pdrs to replace them. Then on 23 January 1917 it was joined by a section from 191st Heavy Bty ready to bring it up to a strength of six guns. (Note: 191st Heavy Bty had been formed at Ewshot on 21 June; its other section was posted to 9th Heavy Bty.) In late February 1/1st Essex Bty battery was ordered to move its four guns to a new position where two additional guns were already in place; it required two Holt 75 caterpillar tractors in addition to the horse teams to move the guns.

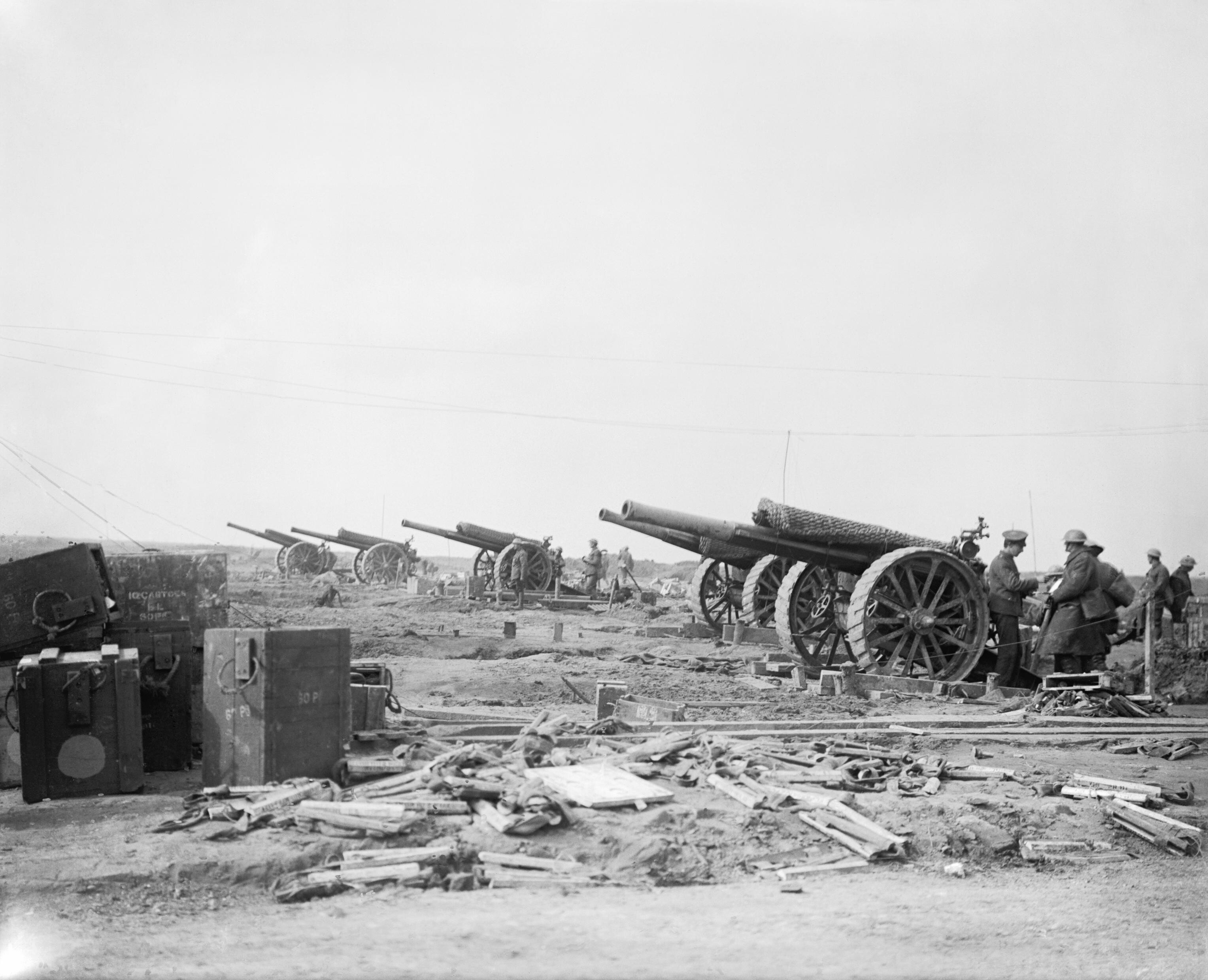
A battery of 60-pounders deployed during the Battle of Vimy Ridge.

By the end of 1916 First Army and Canadian Corps had taken over command of the Vimy sector, and in early 1917 they began preparations for the Battle of Vimy Ridge to open the Arras Offensive. As well as preparing the new positions, the battery carried out CB tasks and supported trench raids by Canadian troops. On 1 April 1/1st Essex Hvy Bty fired 500 rounds on CB targets and from then on it was firing night and day as part of the preliminary bombardment. On 3 April it supported a raid by 34th Division, otherwise it fired on Thélus and Vimy villages, and continued the CB tasks. On 7 April it received an extra 60-pdr gun on loan from the Ordnance Gun Park to increase its firepower, though by Z day only four guns were in action, the others having damaged buffers. The artillery preparation for the battle was highly successful, with most German batteries destroyed or neutralised. The attack went in at 05.30 on 9 April with a heavy barrage and bombardment; the Canadians overran three lines of German trenches and seized the crest of the ridge. During the day 1/1st Essex Hvy Bty's four serviceable guns fired about 1400 rounds, latterly firing in response to 'Zone Calls' requested by the observation aircraft from No 16 Squadron, Royal Flying Corps, and at fleeting targets; the German counter-attacks were broken up before they were even launched.

That night the battery bombarded Vimy with 300 gas shells before it was captured the following morning. Firing continued over subsequent days as the Canadians consolidated the captured ground and carried out a limited exploitation. 1st Essex Hvy Bty pushed a section forward to Neuville-St Vaast on 12 April, where it continued CB fire, but the rear section was soon practically out of range. Rear Section went forward to Neuville-St Vaast on 20 April when Forward Section took up positions on top of the captured ridge itself – proudly proclaiming itself the first heavy battery of Canadian Corps HA to get there. The Arras Offensive on Third Army's front was becoming bogged down but on 28 April Canadian Corps carried out a relatively successful attack on Arleux-en-Gohelle (the Battle of Arleux) during which 1/1st Essex Hvy Bty neutralised hostile batteries and engaged German forces that 16 Sqn RFC spotted massing for counter-attacks. The battery was heavily shelled on 30 April, with two guns put out of action and 1000 rounds of ammunition destroyed, but it was able to carry out its usual CB tasks when Canadians captured Fresnoy-en-Gohelle on 3 May, and attacked the power station at La Coulotte on 10 May and Hill 70 on 2 and 28 June.

Batteries were regularly moved from one HAG to another, so 1/1st Essex Bty was unusual in having remained with 50th HAG for over a year. However, on 14 July it was transferred 78th HAG with XIII Corps, but remained at Thélus on CB tasks in the Vimy sector, which was now quiet apart from occasional trench raids. At this period the battery was commanded by Maj H. Jolly. At the end of July it began work on a new concrete forward position at the sugar factory on the Arleux road, moving three guns in on 23 September while work continued. In October it also constructed winter standings for the horses.

==== Passchendaele ====
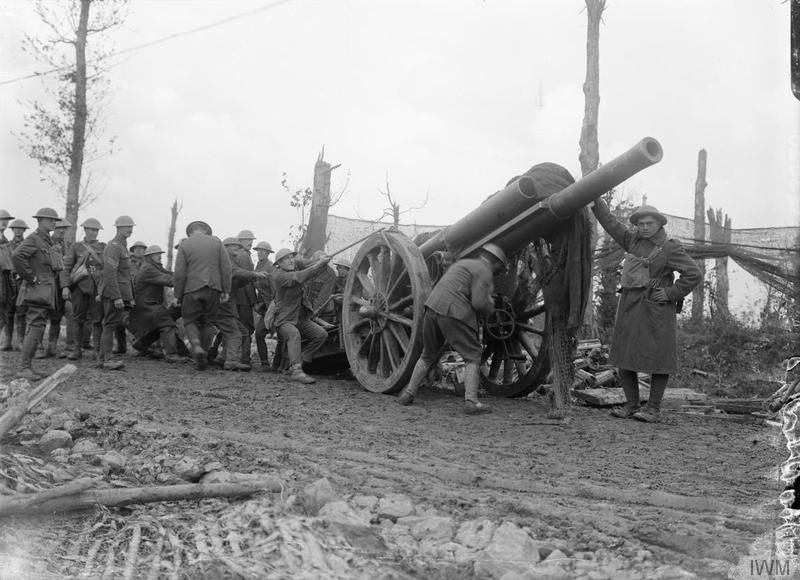
RGA manhandling a 60-pounder gun, September 1917.

On 19 October, the battery had to leave the positions it had worked on all summer when it was sent to reinforce Fifth Army fighting in the Third Ypres Offensive. Leaving the guns behind, the horses and transport marched by road, while the gunners were taken in motor lorries. On arrival at 'Essex Farm' in the Ypres Salient the battery was assigned to 65th HAG with XVIII Corps. It relieved 16th Hvy Bty and took over its guns in position east of the Yser Canal facing Langemarck.

Although the autumn battles (the Menin Road (20 September), Polygon Wood (26 September) and Broodseinde (4 October)) had been highly successful because of the weight of artillery brought to bear on German positions, the tables had turned as the offensive continued: British batteries were clearly observable from the Passchendaele Ridge and were subjected to intense CB fire, while their own guns sank into the mud and became difficult to aim and fire. 65th HAG needed a working party from the infantry to help it move up the quantities of ammunition being fired. As well as its CB and harassing fire (HF) tasks, 1/1st Essex Hvy Bty took part in two days of bombardment before the attack of 26 September (the Second Battle of Passchendaele) and assisted with barrages during the assault, but it went badly for the infantry of XVIII Corps, struggling through the mud. II Corps HQ relieved XVIII Corps on 2 November but the fighting continued. The attack of 6 November against Passchendaele village was carried out by Canadian Corps, supported by II Corps HA, 1/1st Essex Hvy Bty firing hundreds of HE and gas shells. However, the road up to the forward position that Left Section was trying to prepare was now impassable, and one of the guns was unserviceable. The battery was in action again when the Canadians finally captured Passchendaele on 10 November.

==== Winter 1917–18 ====
The fighting at Ypres largely died down after 10 November, but 1/1st Essex Hvy Bty continued daily CB and HF shoots for another mont, firing over 100 rounds a day even in quiet periods. It came under three hours of retaliatory fire on 21 November when one gun suffered a direct hit with several killed and wounded. The battery struggled to push its Forward Section across the notorious Steenbeek and Lekkerbotterbeek streams (the cause of much misery during the Passchendaele fighting), hampered by the mud and broken bridges. There were further casualties to an attached working party on 11 December. Only after 13 December did the firing dwindle. The BEF's heavy artillery was now reorganised, the ad hoc HAGs becoming permanent brigades. 1/1st Essex Hvy Bty was taken over by 79th HAG on 18 December, the day it became 79th Bde. It was designated a 'Mixed' brigade, with two 60-pdr heavy batteries (1/1st Essex and 142nd (Durham)) and four siege batteries with 6-, 8- and 9.2-inch howitzers. 1/1st Essex Hvy Bty remained with 79th Bde for the rest of the war. When it joined, the brigade was tasked with CB duties in Second Army in the northern part of the Ypres Salient, but on 22 December, Fourth Army HQ took over from Second. It reverted to Second Army before the German spring offensive began on 21 March 1918.

There were occasional CB shoots – an exchange of fire on 28 December left one of the battery's 60-pdrs damaged – and SOS bombardments when called for by the infantry. Meanwhile, the gunners worked on reserve positions if the expected German offensive threatened the Passchendaele Salient. When the Steenbeek and Lekkerbotterbeek overflowed in January, the guns of Forward Section became submerged. On 28 January the exhausted battery was relieved by 142nd (Durham) Hvy Bty and went back to Poperinghe for rest. It returned to the lines on 25 February.

==== Spring Offensive ====
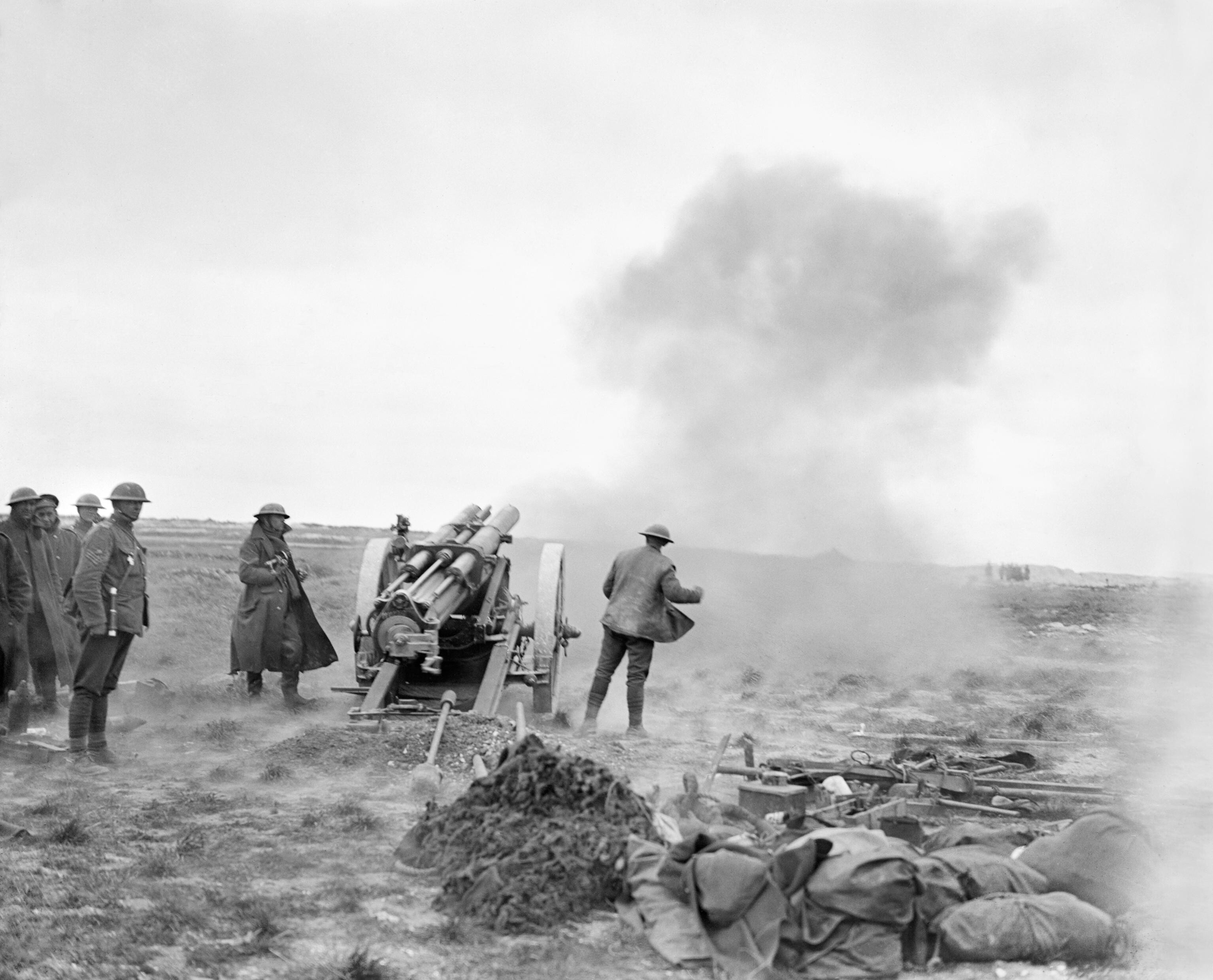
A 60-pdr in action in the open during the German Spring Offensive.

The German Spring Offensive opened on 21 March against Third and Fifth Armies, and Second Army was unaffected. On 24 March 79th Bde pulled all its batteries out from the Canal Bank area into reserve and placed the guns in the siege park. First and Second Armies were hit by the second phase of the Spring Offensive, the Battle of the Lys, starting on 9 April. The 60-pdr batteries pulled their guns back into position at midnight to join the field artillery firing in support of the hard-pressed infantry of 34th Division (XI Corps). On 17 April 1st Essex and 142nd (Durham) Hvy Btys moved from Gouy-Servins to Morbecque, where they registered their guns for CB and night HF fire. By the night of 21/22 April First Army's situation in front of the Forêt de Nieppe had stabilised but the Germans began nightly bombardments with mustard gas shells to drive 5th Division out. However the division had strong artillery support including 79th Bde RGA, which replied vigorously to the attack, bombarding the German billets and gun positions each night, and continuing HF shoots throughout the day. The German offensive on this front ended on 29 April.

On 28 June, 79th Bde's CB fire supported XI Corps in Operation Borderland, a limited counter-attack on La Becque and other fortified farms in front of the Forest of Nieppe, in what was described as 'a model operation' for artillery cooperation. 79th Brigade transferred with XI Corps to the command of the reconstituted Fifth Army on 1 July, then on 12 July it was pulled out of the line to undergo intensive training before the Allies launched their summer counter-offensive. On 31 July it was put on 6 hours' notice to move.

==== Hundred Days Offensive ====
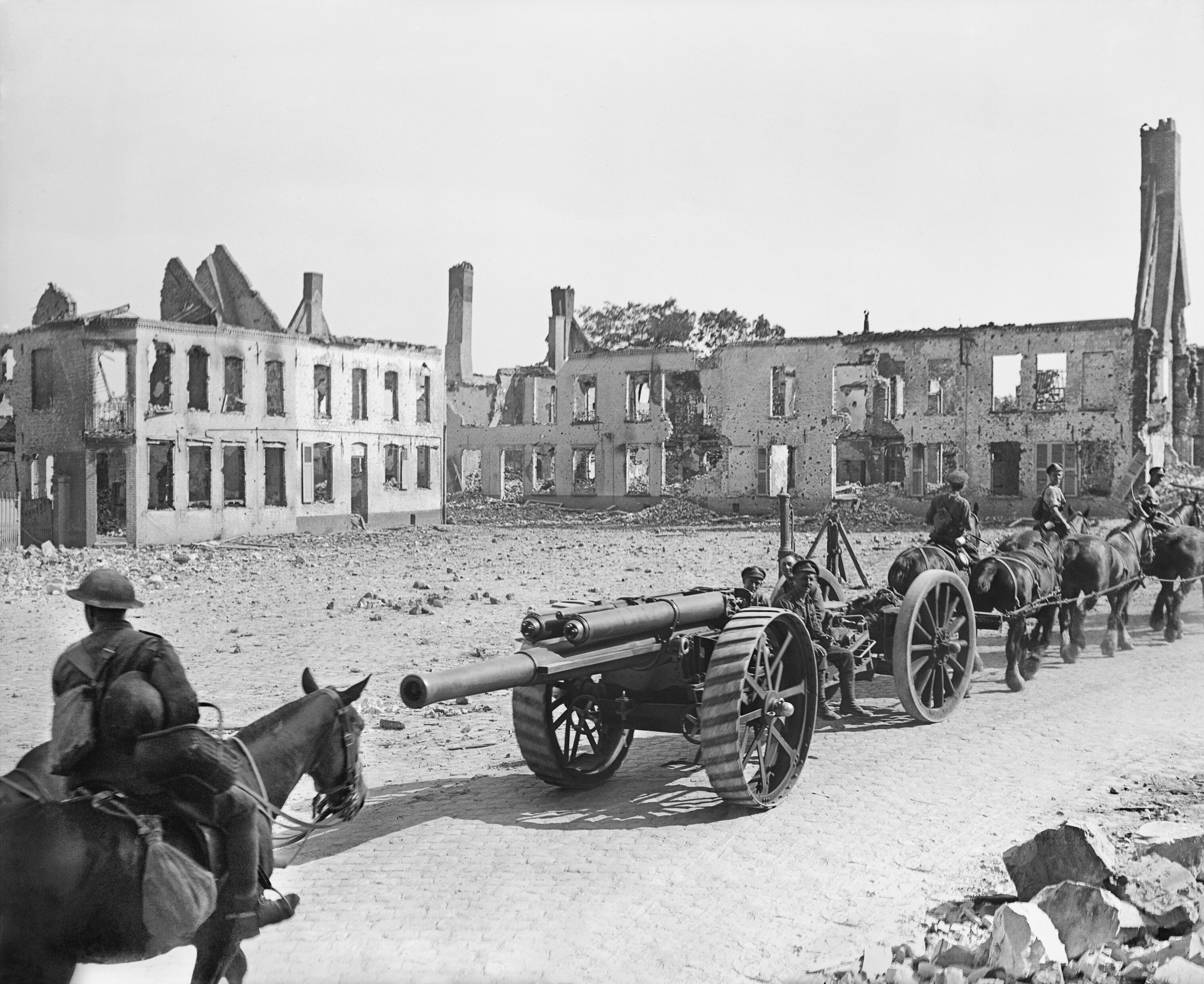
A 60-pounder moving up during the Hundred Days Offensive, 1918.

79th Brigade moved up to join Fourth Army on 4–6 August, the 60-pdrs travelling last and taking up positions at Boves. The batteries remained silent while they brought up ammunition by night. The Allied Hundred Days Offensive began with the Battle of Amiens on 8 August, attacking without a preliminary bombardment. 79th Brigade supported the Canadian and Australian Corps with neutralising CB fire, HF on likely approaches and assembly points for counter-attackers, and sudden concentrations on German batteries. The British artillery fire was particularly effective. Practically all the objectives were taken by the end of the day and the advance continued on 9 August; the lighter batteries (60-pdrs and 6-inch howitzers) of 79th Bde began reconnoitring new positions and before nightfall on 10 August they were in action in front of Vrely.

79th Brigade's batteries contributed CB and HF shoots to support minor attacks by the neighbouring French Army, then Fourth Army's attack of 21 August (part of the Battle of Albert) . They were active again in support of the French on 1 September, then fired many concentrations on hostile batteries while Fourth Army crossed the Somme and occupied Péronne. on 2 September. 1/1st Essex Hvy Bty kept up harassing fire on roads and tracks all night. 79th Brigade was then ordered to fire off all its ammunition and be ready to move; 1/1st Essex Hvy Bty was withdrawn on the evening of 4 September, going into GHQ Reserve at Boutillerie near Amiens on 7 September. The guns were overhauled, the men issued with new uniforms and training carried out, ready for the next phase of the offensive.

On 14 September, 79th Bde came under the orders of IX Corps and the batteries pulled into position on 16 September. The Battle of Épehy was launched on 18 September; again, there was no preliminary bombardment and 79th Bde's batteries were silent until Zero hour. Then they supplied the usual CB fire, followed by HF shoots on enemy assembly points and bridge approaches. In the afternoon they took part in a defensive barrage that broke up a German counter-attack. On 24 September IX corps carried out an attack to close up to the Hindenburg Line, preceded by two days of deliberate bombardment.

On 29 September, IX Corps carried out an assault crossing of the St Quentin Canal, with 79th Bde directly supporting 46th (North Midland) Division, which had to storm the canal itself, and had the heaviest level of artillery support of any British division in the war . Its assault was a smashing success. The canal defences had largely been destroyed by the heavy guns, which continued firing on the canal banks until the last possible moment as 137th (Staffordshire) Brigade stormed the outpost line and then scrambled across the canal using captured bridges and dams, using lifebelts and planks. The objectives were taken by 15.30.

During the follow-up operations next day, 1/1st Essex Hvy Bty bombarded 'Talana Hill' for 20 minutes, allowing 3rd Brigade of 1st Division to capture it without much difficulty. During the night of 30 September/1 October, 79th Bde moved its battery positions forward to Pontruet to continue supporting 1st Division, and five guns of 1/1st Essex Hvy Bty were pushed forward. The brigade was now participating in the destruction of the inner defences of the Hindenburg Line, known as the Beaurevoir Line, in preparation for IX Corps' attack (the Second Battle of Cambrai). Harassing fire was carried out on the night of 6/7 October, and all through 7 October and up to Zero the heavies carried out CB fire and shelled important localities. Once the attack went in the heavies continued intense CB and long-range HF fire until the infantry were on the objective. The Germans evacuated Cambrai that night and Fourth Army pursued them to the River Selle, 79th Bde moving forward to Montbrehain and then to Bohain.

On 11 October preparations began for IX Corps' next assault on the German line along the Selle. CB fire began on 13 October, but mist and rain disrupted air reconnaissance on 15 and 16 October. However, Zero for the Battle of the Selle was fixed on 16 October for 05.20 the next day. The first day of the battle went well, one German counter-attack being broken up when all available guns were turned onto it, but the attackers were still short of their objective, the Sambre–Oise Canal. Steady progress was also made on the second and third days as Fourth Army closed up to the canal; 79th Bde moved up to Wassigny after it was captured.

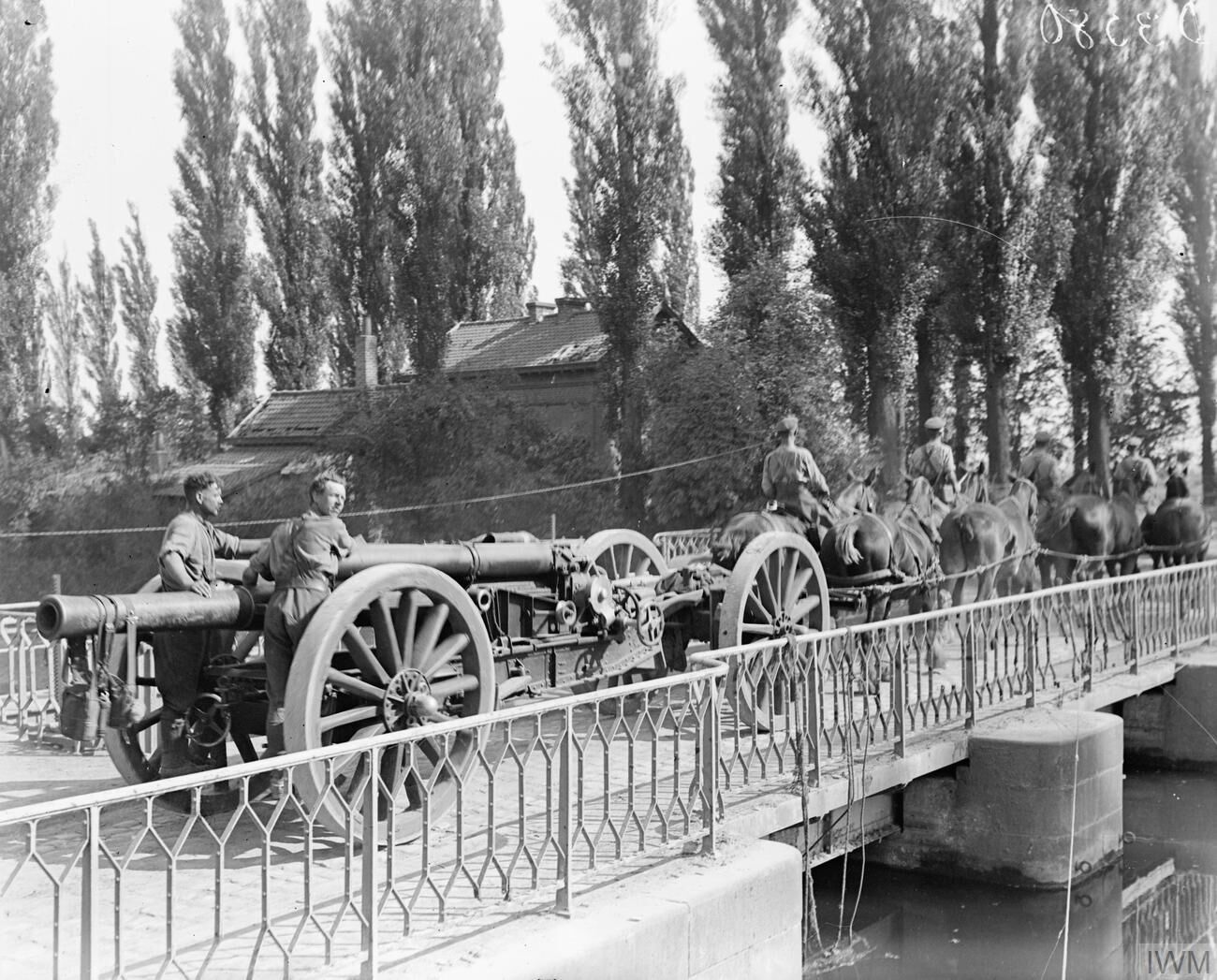
A 60-pounder gun being moved up in 1918.

IX Corps renewed its advance on 23 October, with 79th Bde part of a massive corps artillery reserve, carrying out CB and destructive shoots along and beyond the canal. The attack went in at 01.20 in moonlight, and the results were extremely satisfactory. As the regimental historian relates, 'The guns of Fourth Army demonstrated, on 23 October, the crushing effect of well co-ordinated massed artillery. they simply swept away the opposition'. After a pause to regroup and reconnoitre, while 79th Bde bombarded the Fesmy-le-Sart area, IX Corps stormed across the canal on 4 November (the Battle of the Sambre). As the attack went in, 1/1st Essex and 142nd (Durham) Hvy Btys each advanced a section up to the canal bank near Oisy. After that the campaign became a pursuit of a beaten enemy, in which the slow-moving heavy guns could play little part: 79th Bde was ordered to park its guns at Viesly on 6 November. The war ended with the Armistice with Germany on 11 November.

==== After the Armistice ====
On 15 November, 79th Bde was ordered to join IV Corps, which was to advance into Germany as part of the army of occupation. The brigade began its march on 15 December and went into winter quarters in Belgium with 1/1st Essex Hvy Bty billeted at Marbais. It was not until 24 April 1919 that the battery left Marbais to join the British Army of the Rhine, crossing the frontier on 30 April and going to Dreiborn. Demobilisation proceeded during the early part of 1919, accelerating after the Treaty of Versailles was signed.

After returning to England, 1/1st Essex Heavy Battery passed into suspended animation on 11 October 1919 at Sandling, Folkestone.

=== 2/1st East Anglian (Essex) Heavy Battery ===
Having trained at Stratford, 2/1st Essex Bty joined 1/1st Essex Bty with 69th (2nd EA) Division at Thetford on 6 November 1915. On 24 April 1916, after 1/1st Essex Bty had gone to France, the battery was transferred from 69th (2nd EA) Division to 5th Provisional Brigade at Lowestoft.

Provisional brigades had been formed in 1915 from TF men who had not volunteered for overseas service or were unfit. They were employed on coast defence. The Military Service Act 1916 swept away the Home/Foreign service distinction, and all TF soldiers became liable for overseas service, if medically fit. The Provisional Brigades were then given the subsidiary role of physical conditioning to render men fit for drafting overseas. 5th Provisional Brigade became 225th Mixed Brigade in December 1916. 2/1st Essex Bty served with 225th Mixed Bde until the Armistice and was disbanded in 1919.

== Postwar ==
=== 232 (Essex) Medium Battery ===
When the TF was reconstituted on 7 February 1920, the Essex Heavy Bty was reformed at Stratford as a battery of 11th (Essex and Suffolk) Medium Brigade, RGA, which was headquartered in Ipswich. The TF was reorganised as the Territorial Army the following year, when the units were renumbered: the battery became 232 (Essex) Medium Bty in 58th (Essex & Suffolk) Medium Brigade. The RGA was subsumed into the Royal Artillery (RA) in 1924.

In 1932, the battery left 58th Medium Bde (which then dropped the 'Essex' part of its title) and joined 85th (East Anglian) Field Bde at Stratford – descended from the old 1st Essex AV and 2nd East Anglian RFA – in which it became 213 (Essex) Field Bty (a new 232 (Suffolk) Med Bty was formed at the same time in 58th). When the TA doubled in size after the Munich Crisis, 213 (Essex) Bty joined 85th Field Regiment's new duplicate, 134th (East Anglian) Field Regiment.

During World War II 134th Field Rgt went to India and became 134th (East Anglian) Jungle Field Rgt. It converted again into 134th (East Anglian) Medium Rgt in October 1944 when 213 Bty was disbanded. It was not reformed after the war.

== Memorials ==
There is a memorial at the Army Reserve Centre at Romford, originally at Artillery House, Stratford, in memory of the men of 1st Essex Heavy Bty, RGA, and the other units based there who died in 1914–18.

The Commonwealth War Graves Commission lists 22 names from the Essex Heavy Batteries who died on service during World War I: there may be others who were simply listed under 'RGA'.
