= Pedlinge =

Hamlet in Kent, England

Coordinates: 51.080°N 1.053°E

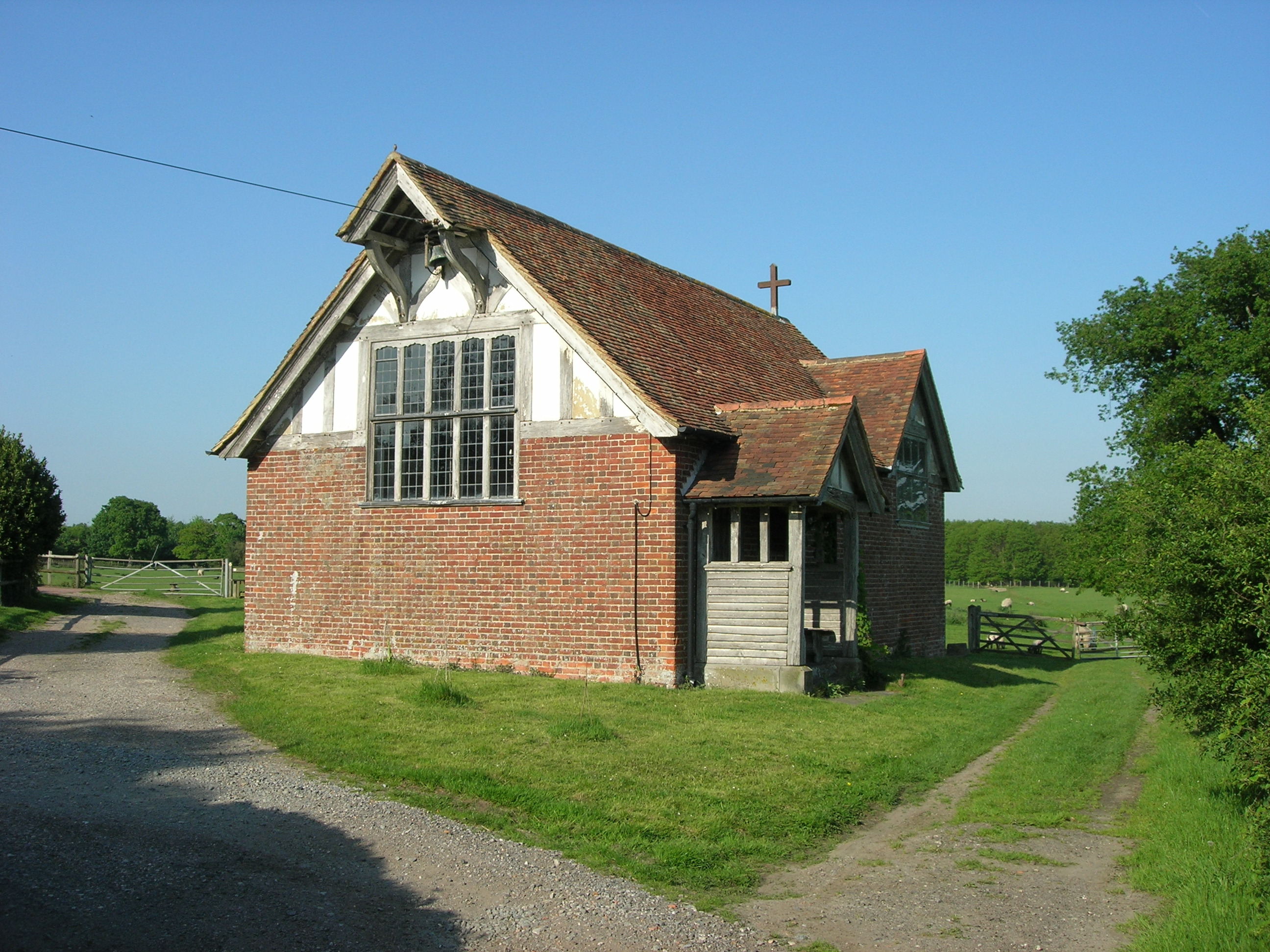
- The church at Pedlinge is a chapel of ease

- Location within Kent
- District: Folkestone and Hythe
- Shire county: Kent
- Region: South East
- Country: England
- Sovereign state: United Kingdom
- Post town: Hythe
- Postcode district: CT21
- Police: Kent
- Fire: Kent
- Ambulance: South East Coast
- UK Parliament: Folkestone and Hythe

Pedlinge is an English hamlet in the Kent parish of Saltwood. It comprises a chapel of ease, house, two cottages and a gatehouse to Sandling Park estate. As of 2007, the gatehouse is derelict.

Sandling Park house is in the hamlet of Sandling and was rebuilt by Alan Hardy. In 2007, it was occupied by his widow Carolyn Hardy.

The chapel at Pedlinge, traditionally the place of worship of the workers on Sandling Park estate, was commissioned by Laurence Hardy.

== Gallery ==
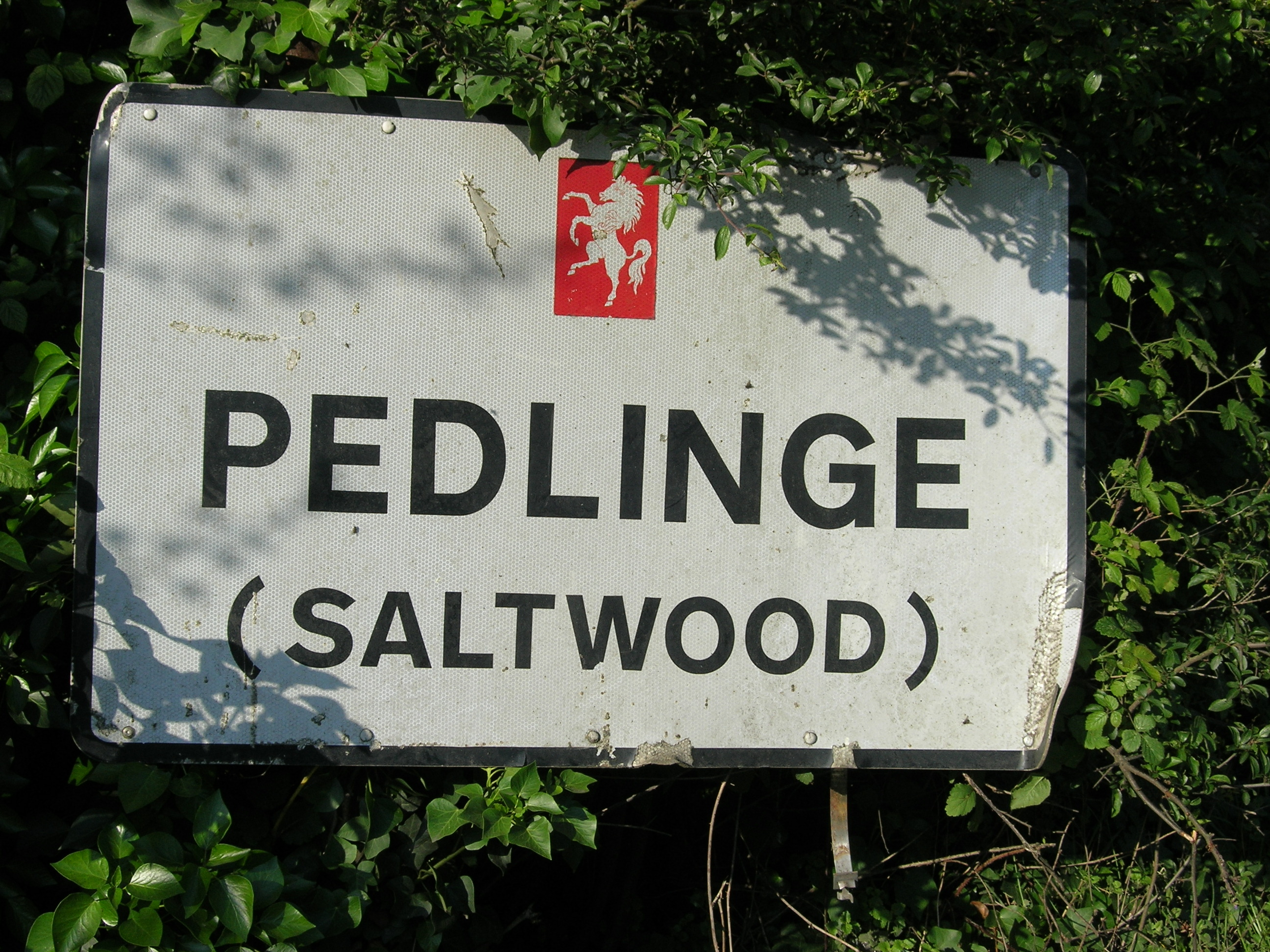
Kent County Council signboard for Pedlinge

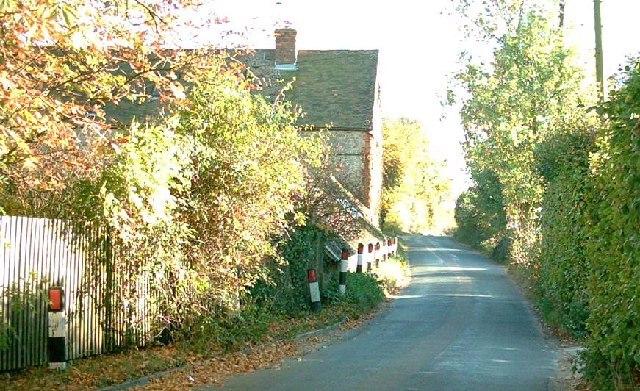
Former B2067 passing Court Farm in October 2003
