= BL 5.4-inch howitzer =

Ordnance BL 5.4-inch howitzer
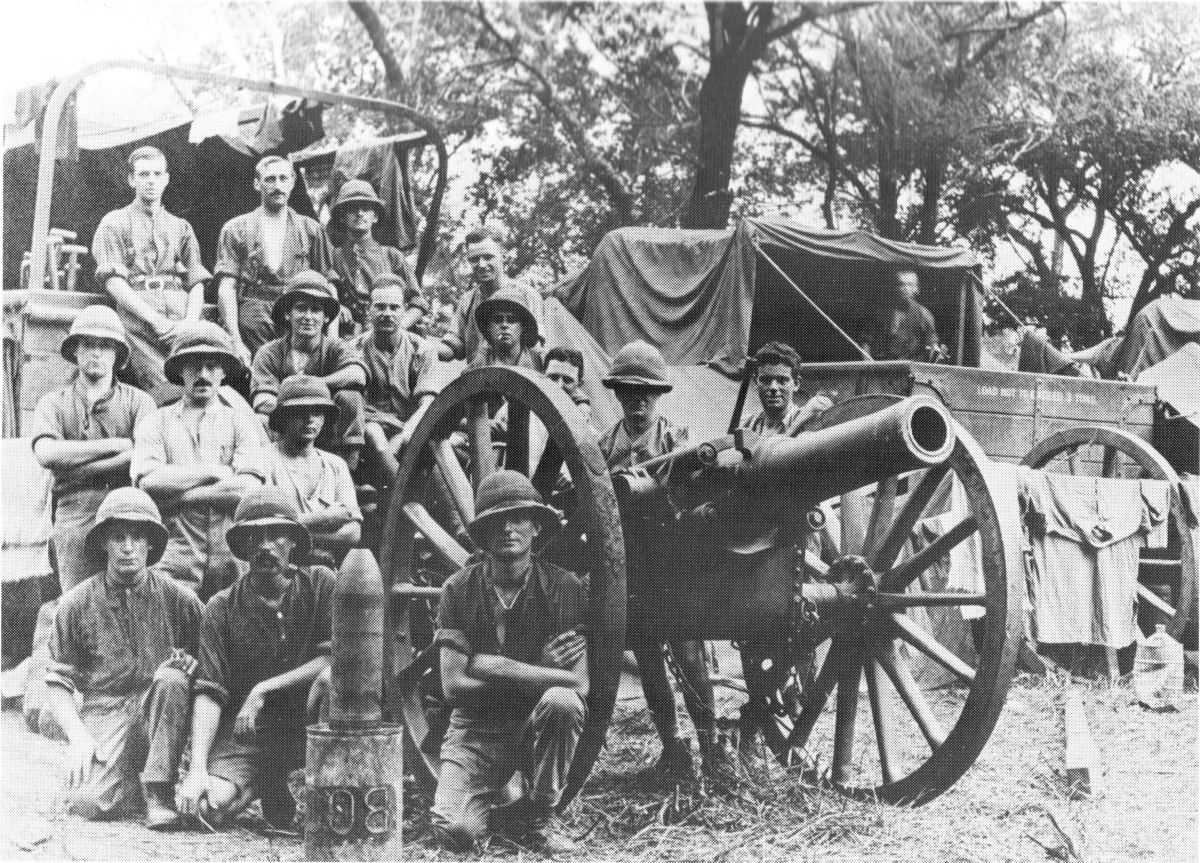
- Gun and crew, East Africa, 1916 or 1917. Photo courtesy of SANDF Archives, from Nöthling, C J (ed), "Ultima Ratio Regum: Artillery History of South Africa" 1987
- Type: Field howitzer
- Place of origin: United Kingdom

Service history
- In service: 1895–1919
- Used by: British India
- Wars: Second Boer War; First World War

Specifications
- Barrel length: Bore: 4 ft 6 in (1.37 m)
- Shell: Separate loading BL; HE shell 60 pounds (27.22 kg) Lyddite
- Calibre: 5.4-inch (137.2 mm)
- Recoil: 6 inches (150 mm), hydro-spring constant
- Carriage: Wheeled, box trail
- Elevation: -5° - 45°
- Muzzle velocity: 781 ft/s (238 m/s)
- Effective firing range: 4,800 yards (4,400 m)

The Ordnance BL 5.4-inch howitzer was a version of the British 5-inch howitzer designed for British Indian Army use, especially on the Northwest Frontier.

== Design ==
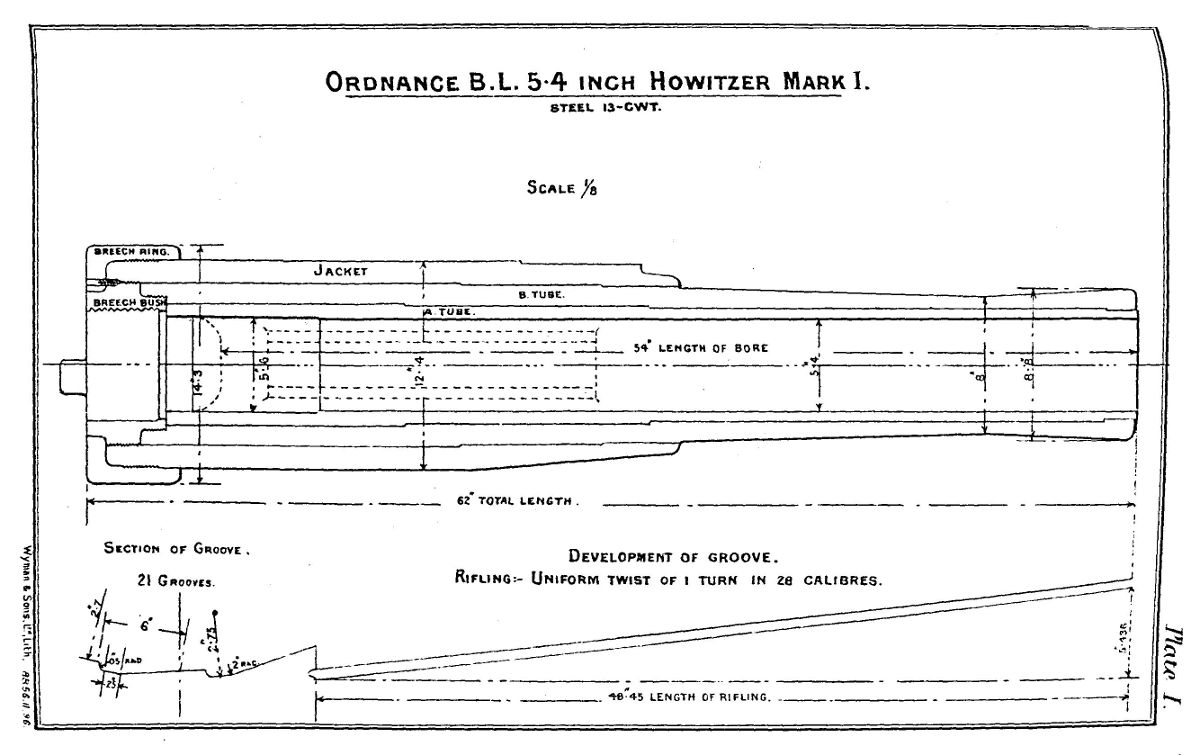
Barrel design

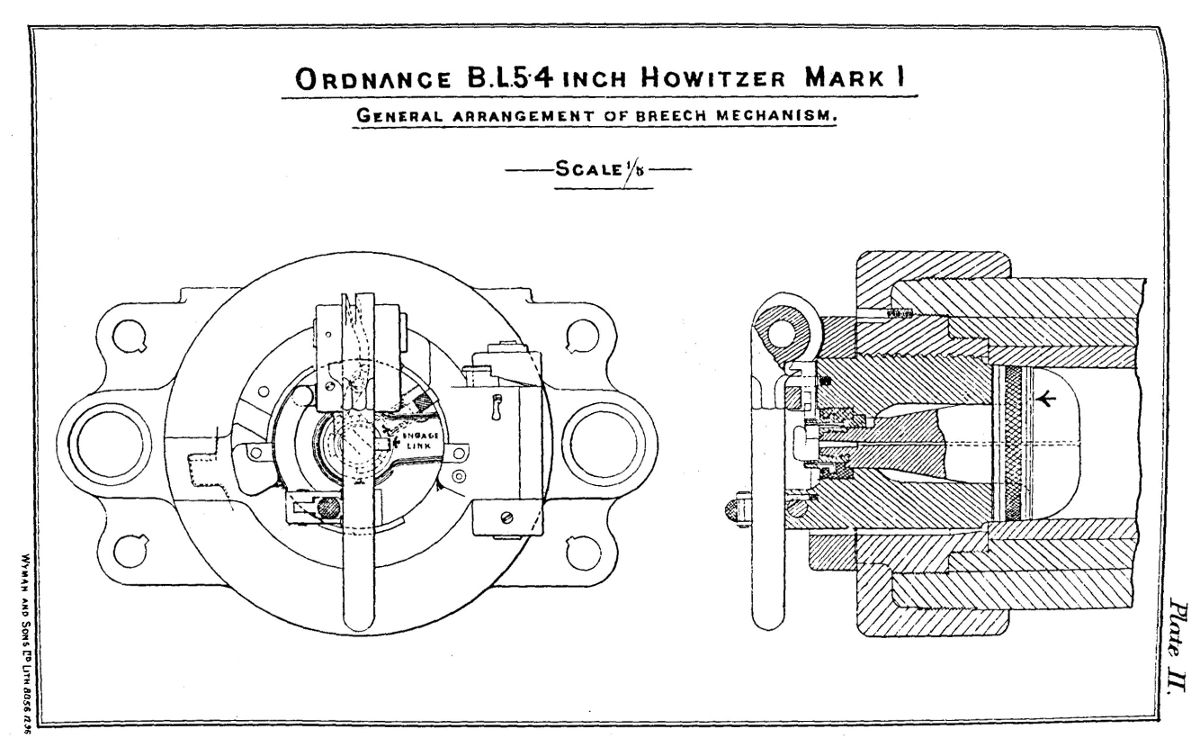
Breech mechanism

The unusual calibre of 5.4 inches may have been determined by a requirement to fire a 60 lb shell. Since the 5-inch howitzer with its 50 lb shell was later found deficient in both firepower and range, it is possible the Indian Army may have foreseen this, and in fact the 5.4-inch could fire its 60 lb shell the same distance as the 5-inch fired its 50 lb shell i.e. 4800 yards. Also, Hogg & Thurston surmise that raw weight of shell was seen as necessary in India to "put a reasonable amount of fear into the hearts of obstreperous tribesmen inhabiting home-built but robust local fortresses": different conditions than regular British Army artillery was expected to be employed in.

== Combat service ==
=== World War I ===
Four guns were sent from India and served in the East Africa campaign. They were manned by the 134th (Cornwall) Howitzer Battery (TF) from England. The battery was formed at Maktau on 4 February 1916 and drawn by oxen.

The battery is reported as firing 102 rounds in the bombardment of German positions on the Mgeta river (approximately 100 miles (160 km) SW of Dar es Salam) on 1 January 1917, part of the Rufiji River campaign. This allowed Cunliffe's Nigerian Brigade to cross the Mgeta river and pursue the German force south. One of the guns was destroyed by a premature explosion in this action, with 1 gunner killed and 2 wounded.

The 134th Battery landed at Lindi in the far south of German East Africa near the border with Portuguese East Africa (Mozambique) in October 1917 and moved west inland. Two of their 5.4-inch howitzers were sent to Morogoro to be used for training, and they took over two 5-inch howitzers from 11th (Hull) Battery, who were short of men through sickness. The 134th were then heavily engaged using one 5.4-inch and two 5-inch howitzers at the major Battle of Nyangao on 16–18 October 1917. The guns knocked out the last of the ten 4.1-inch guns from the Königsberg which the German forces had used as field guns, and provided fire support for the Indian and Nigerian troops.

== Ammunition ==
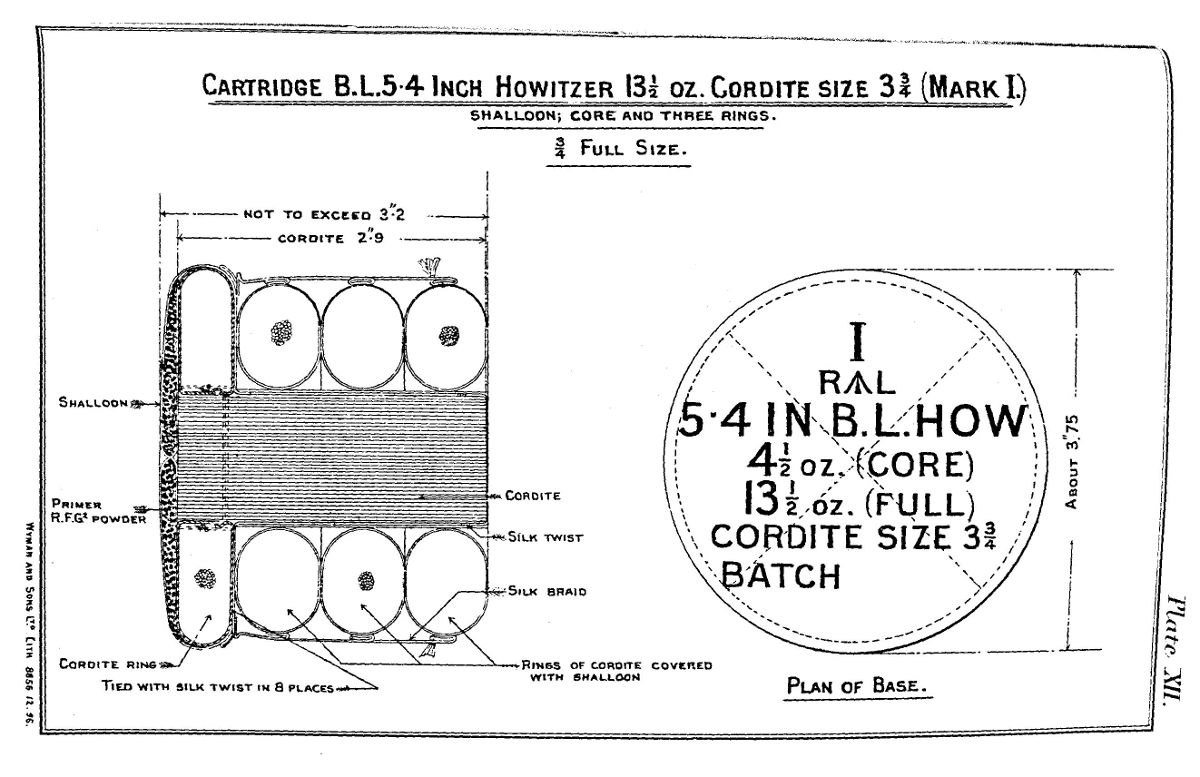
Mk I cordite cartridge, 13½ oz

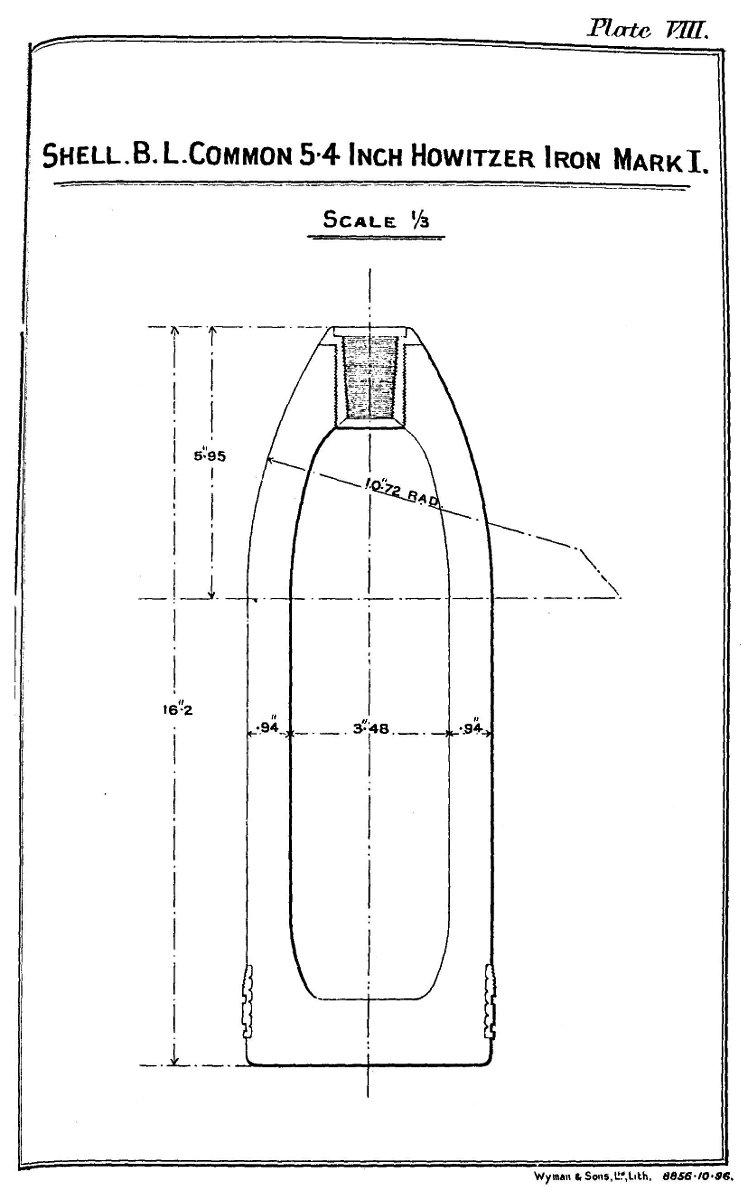
Mk I common shell, iron

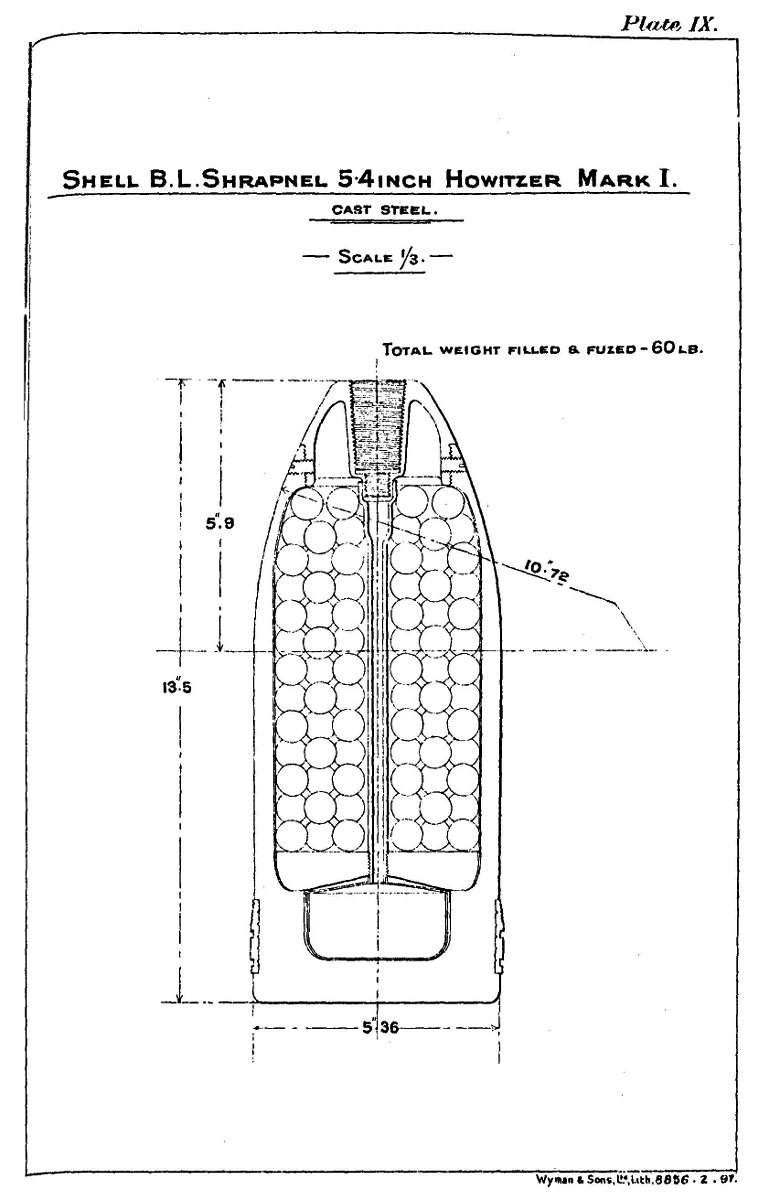
Mk I shrapnel shell, cast steel

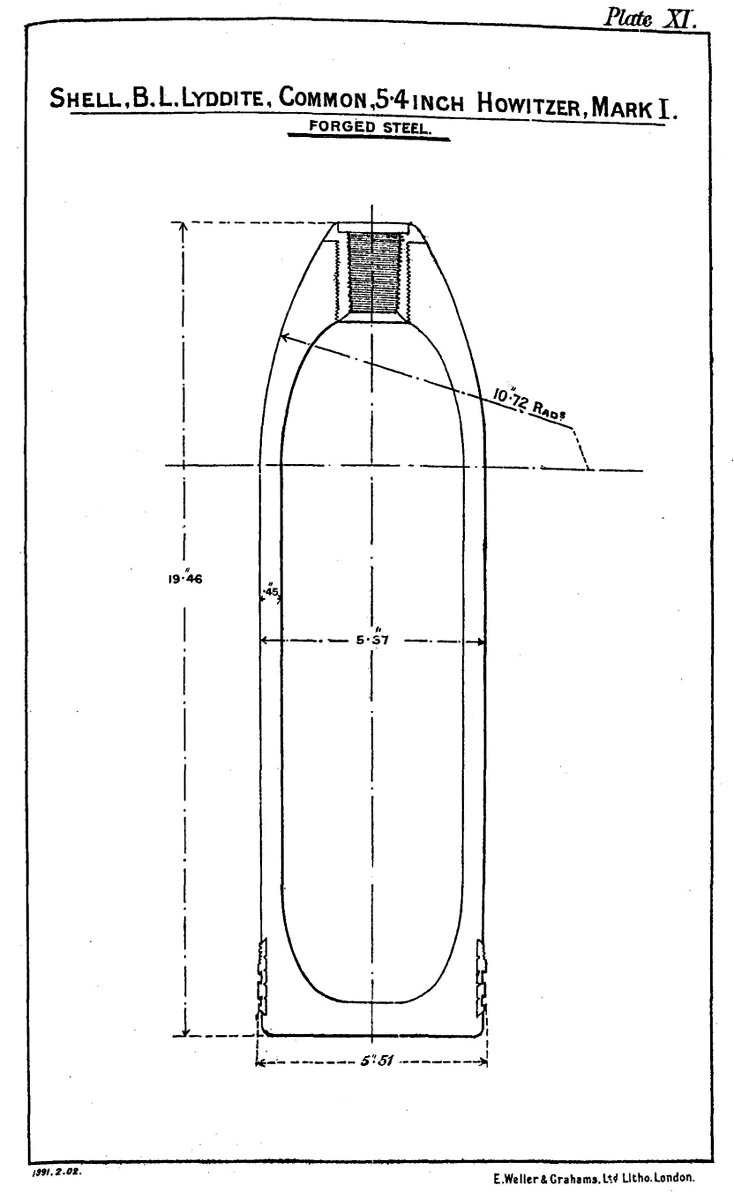
Mk I lyddite shell, forged steel

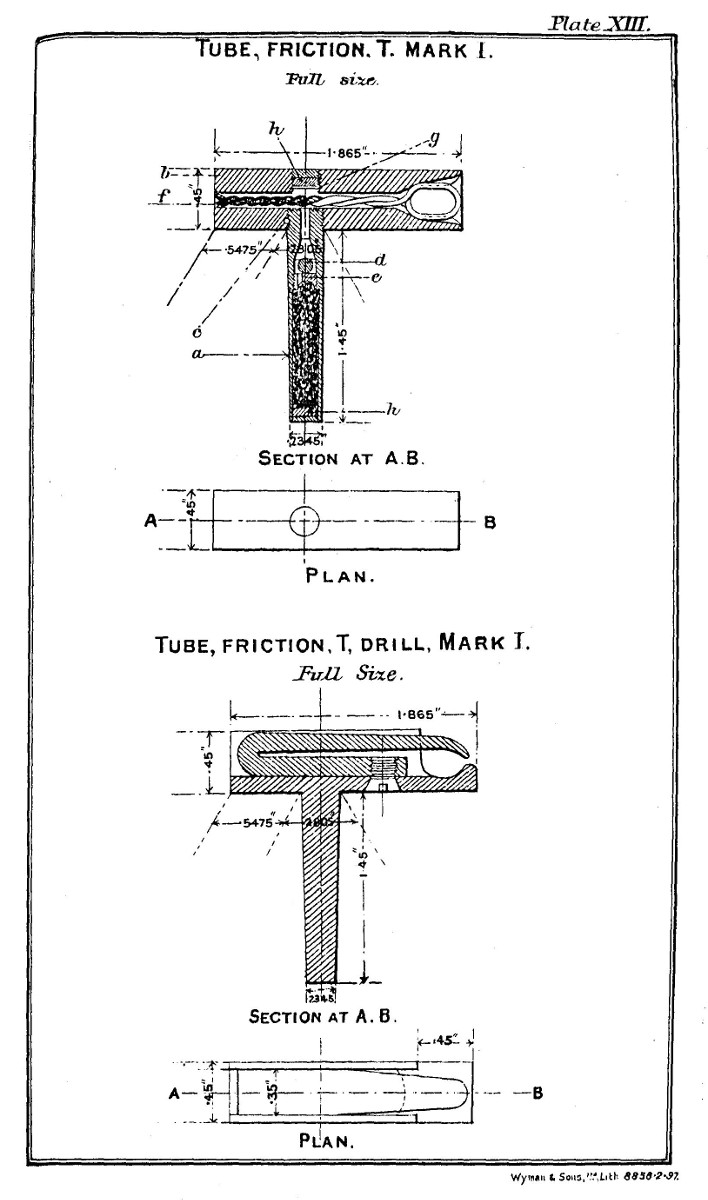
T friction tube Mk I

== See also ==
- Howitzer
- List of howitzers

== Bibliography ==
- General Sir Martin Farndale, History of the Royal Regiment of Artillery. The Forgotten Fronts and the Home Base, 1914–18. London : The Royal Artillery Institution, 1988. ISBN 1-870114-05-1
- I.V. Hogg & L.F. Thurston, British Artillery Weapons & Ammunition 1914–1918. London: Ian Allan, 1972
