= 142nd (Durham) Heavy Battery, Royal Garrison Artillery =

Artillery unit of the British Army in World War I

142nd (Durham) Siege Battery, RGA
- Cap Badge of the Royal Regiment of Artillery
- Active: 31 October 1915–11 October 1919
- Country: United Kingdom
- Branch: British Army
- Role: Heavy artillery
- Part of: Royal Garrison Artillery
- Garrison/HQ: Sunderland
- Engagements: Battle of the Somme; Battle of Vimy Ridge; Third Battle of Ypres; German spring offensive Attack on La Becque; Hundred Days Offensive

142nd (Durham) Heavy Battery (142nd Hvy Bty) was a unit of Britain's Royal Garrison Artillery (RGA) formed during World War I from coast defence gunners of the Durham Royal Garrison Artillery. It served on the Western Front, including the Battles of Vimy Ridge, Passchendaele, the Lys, and the Allied Hundred Days Offensive in 1918. After service with the Occupation forces in the Rhineland, the battery was disbanded in 1919.

== Mobilisation and trainin ==
In the years before World War I, the Royal Garrison Artillery (RGA) had been responsible for the coast defence artillery of the United Kingdom, with Regular Army units supplemented by the 'defended port units' of the part-time Territorial Force. These included the Durham RGA at West Hartlepool, manning the Tees and Hartlepool coastal guns with a mobile heavy battery at Sunderland. The Durham RGA was the only British coast defence unit to engage the enemy during the war, when the Imperial German Navy bombarded Hartlepool and Scarborough on 16 December 1914.

On the outbreak of war, TF units had been invited to volunteer for Overseas Service and on 15 August 1914, the War Office (WO) issued instructions to separate those men who had signed up for Home Service only, and form these into reserve units. On 31 August, the formation of a reserve or 2nd Line unit was authorised for each 1st Line unit where 60 per cent or more of the men had volunteered for Overseas Service. The titles of these 2nd Line units would be the same as the original, but distinguished by a '2/' prefix. In this way duplicate brigades, companies and batteries were created. The Durham Heavy Battery began recruiting its 2nd Line unit in October 1914, and had filled its ranks with volunteers within a week. By the autumn of 1914, the campaign on the Western Front was bogging down into Trench warfare and there was an urgent need for batteries of heavy and siege artillery to be sent to France. The WO authorised 1st line TF RGA companies that had volunteered for overseas service to increase their strength by 50 per cent.

Over the following months and years large numbers of the new RGA units were formed from cadres of TF gunners 142nd (Durham) Heavy Battery, RGA, was authorised on 31 October 1915 and formed from 1/1st and 2/1st Heavy Batteries of the Durham RGA at Sunderland. It was one of only two all-TF heavy field batteries raised from defended ports units. (Note: The other was the 134th (Cornwall) Heavy Bty, which served in the East African Campaign.)

The new 4-gun was commanded by Major John Lynn Marr, son of Sir John Marr, 1st Baronet, a prominent Sunderland shipbuilder. Major Marr had been in command of the Durham RGA's heavy battery since 11 September 1912. 142nd Heavy Bty was sent to Woolwich for training on the new 60-pounder gun, the first TF unit to be so equipped. At Woolwich the battery joined 41st Heavy Brigade, RGA, (Note: In the Royal Artillery a 'brigade' was a lieutenant-colonel's command, comparable with an infantry battalion or cavalry regiment.) which formed at Woolwich on 25 February 1916 and mobilised four days later. 142nd Heavy Bty and 41st Bde then marched to Bordon Camp for two weeks' final training before embarking at Southampton Docks for the Western Front on 21 March 1916.

== Service ==
On arrival at Le Havre on 22 March the battery entrained its guns and heavy draught horses for Bailleul to join Second Army in the Ypres sector. The battery was immediately ordered to hand over its guns to another unit, and to take over a battery of guns already emplaced at the foot of Mont Kemmel. This meant that the personnel received their introduction to frontline service from the battery they were relieving. Mont Kemmel itself was used as the observation post (OP), and from this Maj Marr watched the opening of the Actions of the St Eloi Craters early on 26 March, when the Royal Engineers fired six mines under the enemy's positions at 04.15. The heavy batteries of V Corps, reinforced by Belgian and Canadian guns, had opened fire 10 seconds before so that their shells would land simultaneously with the explosions. Marr watched the 1st Battalion Northumberland Fusiliers dash across No man's land and capture the craters and objectives in front with hardly a casualty (though bloody fighting over the craters continued until 16 April). For the next four months 142nd Hvy Bty remained with 41st Bde at Kemmel, where the front line saw constant low-level trench warfare. The battery carried out its first 'long shoot' of 12 hours 40 minutes on 6 April. Thereafter there were daily shoots at various targets with Shrapnel and Lyddite shells, sometimes with aircraft observation, and received occasional hostile shelling in retaliation, suffering some damage. The batteries of V Corps carried out considerable defensive firing in early June in support of the Canadian Corps in the Battle of Mont Sorrel. RGA brigades became 'Heavy Artillery Groups' (HAGs) from 2 April 1916, thus 41st Bde became 41st HAG within Second Army.

On 31 July the battery was transferred to 55th HAG, which had just arrived from Southampton to join 'Reserve Army' (shortly to become Fifth Army) fighting in the Somme offensive. The battery went south by train and road to join the new group at Albert, where it formed part of I ANZAC Corps' Heavy Artillery (HA). 142nd Heavy Bty was ordered to construct gun positions in 'Sausage Valley' behind Pozières, and its guns were in action on 5 August. These positions were close to the front line and in front of some of the field batteries. The 60-pdr guns of the heavy batteries were called upon for road barrages and counter-battery (CB) fire. From then on the battery took part in all the battles of the Somme offensive, furst supporting the Australian divisions, and later the Canadians, particularly the capture of Courcelette and Thiepval Ridge. As the front progressed the battery's position was increasingly further from the front and less affected by enemy fire. It moved up to Le Sars beyond Courcelette. As winter came on the battery constructed brick standings and corrugated iron shelters for the horses in the wagon lines.

Earlier in the year the War Office had decided that four-gun heavy batteries should be increased to six guns. This was done for 142nd Hvy Bty on 5 October 1916 when it was joined by a section from 176th Hvy Bty. (Note: 176th Heavy Bty was raised as a New Army unit at Woolwich on 8 May 1916. It went out to the Western Front on 29th September 1916 and was immediately broken up as follows: one section joined 50th HAG on 1 October and was posted to 145th (East Cheshire) Hvy Bty; the other two sections joined Canadian Corps HA on 5 October and were posted to 132nd (Oxfordshire) and 142nd (Durham) Hvy Btys.)

Fifth Army kept hammering away on the Somme front until November, and continued with Operations on the Ancre, January–March 1917.

=== Vimy Ridge ===
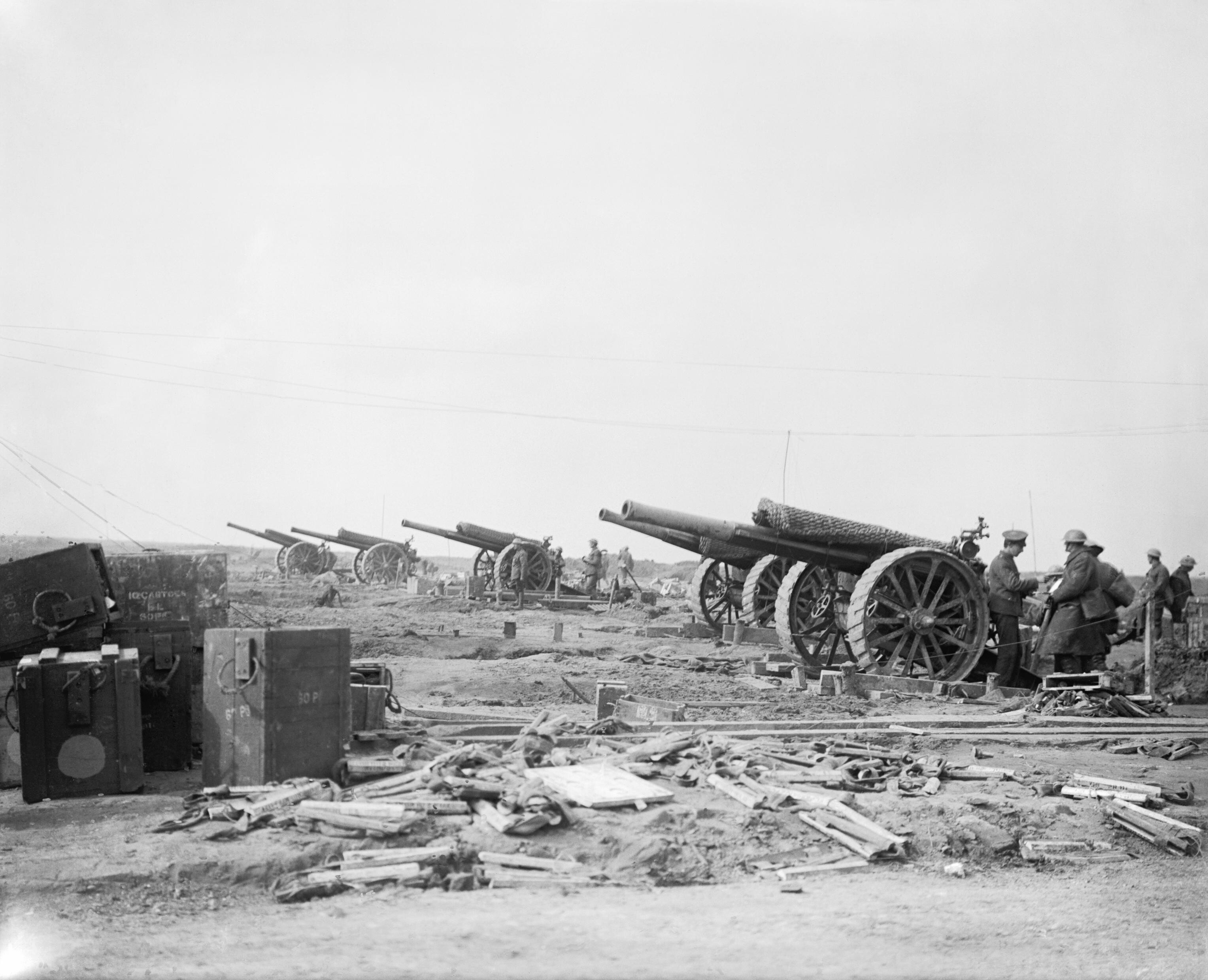
A battery of 60-pounders deployed during the Battles of Vimy and Arras, 1917.

142nd Heavy Bty was sent on 21 March to join 76th HAG in the north with First Army, arriving at St Pol on 25 March. First Army was preparing for the forthcoming Arras Offensive, starting with an effective CB programme in early April. 76th HAG was positioned north of Bois de Berthonval, supporting Canadian Corps, which was to carry out the opening attack on Vimy Ridge. Maximum use was made of observation balloons and aircraft, (Note: BE2s from No 16 Squadron, Royal Flying Corps, under Major Paul Maltby.) when weather permitted, to pinpoint opposing batteries for the heavies. The ruling principle was that isolated enemy batteries should be dealt with first, since those that were closely grouped could be more easily and economically neutralised with high explosive and gas shell just before the assault. Huge amounts of ammunition were stockpiled before the operation, including 10,000 rounds for the nine 60-pdr batteries with Canadian Corps Heavy Artillery (HA) specifically to meet possible counter-attacks. After the preparatory fire, the bombardment began on 7 April, ending with a 'hurricane' bombardment at 05.30 on 9 April simultaneously with the attack. 'The artillery attack was a brilliant success. The German artillery was largely destroyed, and what was not was effectively neutralised'. Canadian Corps succeeded in taking almost all its objectives on the first day, and Vimy Ridge with its magnificent observation over enemy territory was in Allied hands.

=== Summer 1917 ===
The Arras offensive continued for several weeks. All the 60-pdr batteries moved into forward positions to keep the retreating enemy within range, but they were unable to advance across the old battle zone because of the state of the roads. On 22 April, 142nd Hvy Bty moved out on 16 April and moved into Third Army's secor. It transferred to 44th (South African) HAG on 22 April at Vélu, beyond Bapaume, with the wagon lines at Frémicourt. The battery position in Vélu Wood was regularly shelled by a 5.9-inch (15 cm) howitzer bit without casualties. Early in June half the battery moved up to a position beside a large waste dump on the Canal du Nord, which was hidden from enemy observation, but provided a good OP for spotting enemy gun flashes. In June Maj Marr was recalled to London to take up a post in the Merchant Shipping Department of the Admiralty. Captain S.W. Boulton, a prewar officer of the Durham Heavy Bty, was promoted to succeed him in command of 142nd Hvy Bty.

On the night of 15/16 June the battery exchanged guns and positions with 26th Hvy Bty, carrying out the relief by half batteries and completing it by 02.00. The new position was next to the sugar factory at Vaulx-Vraucourt, with an OP overlooking the Bullecourt sector. On 29 June, the battery moved again to the north of Saint-Léger, near Hénin, with the wagon lines at Hendecourt, a long way back from the battery position, but with comfortable billets for the drivers. It remained in position here through the summer, but went through a rapid succession of chnages in command. On arrival it was under 14th HAG, but command was immediately transferred to 4th HAG under V Corps, and then on 7 July to 59th HAG with VII Corps. On 7 August VII Corps left and on 9 August 39th HAG supporting XVII Corps took over 142nd Hvy Bty. The battery continued the routine trench warfare shoots, particularly night harassing fire (HF) tasks.

On 23 July Capt Boulton's temporary promotion to major came through, but on 26 July Maj Cave arrived to supersede him, and he reverted to captain. However, Maj Cave was sent home on medical grounds at the end of August and Capt Boulton once again took over as officer commanding the battery, becoming Acting Major again from 27 September.

=== Ypres ===
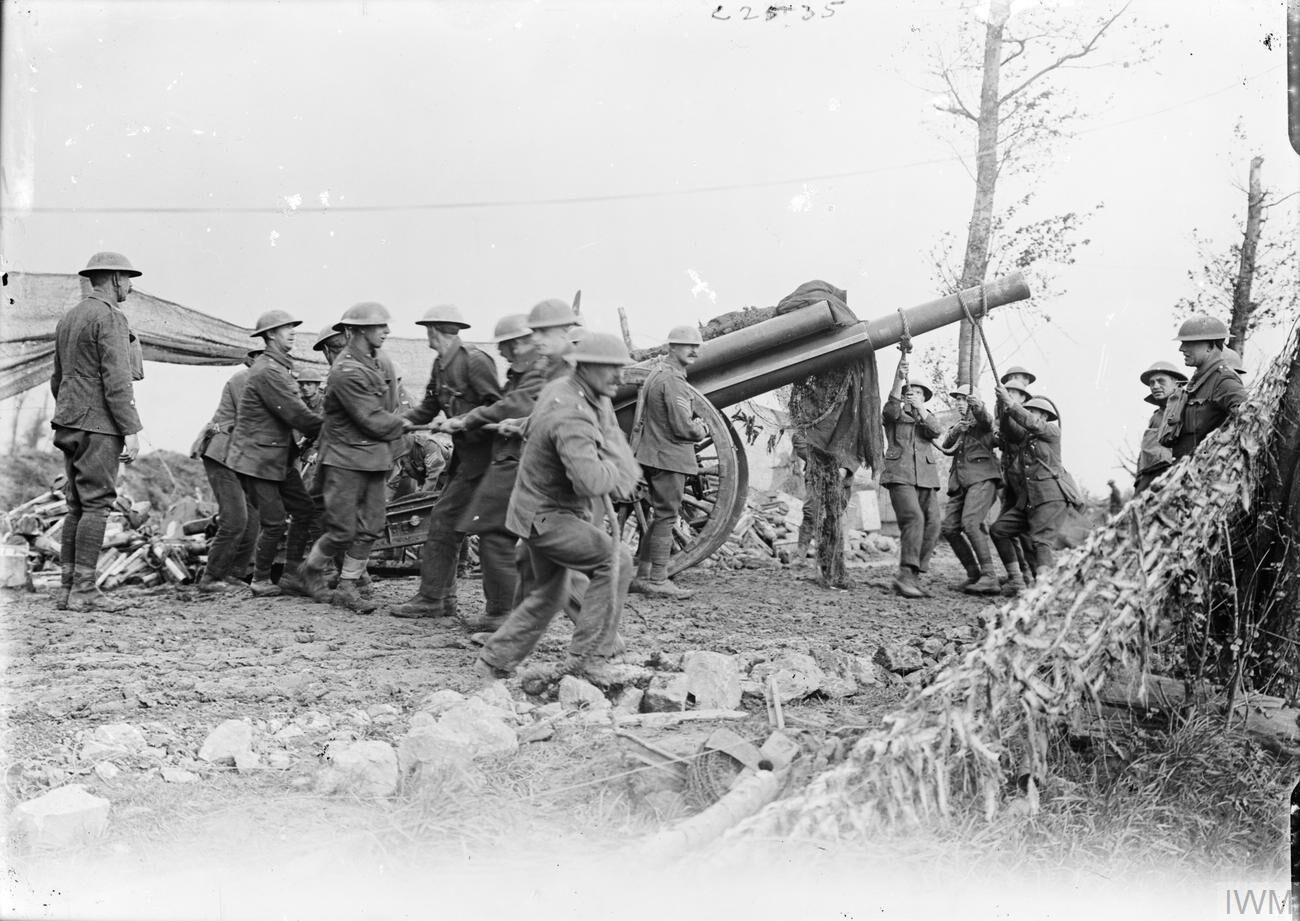
Moving a 60-pounder during the Third Ypres offensive, September 1917.

On 29 August 142nd Hvy Bty entrained for the north, having been ordered to join Fifth Army in the Ypres Salient. Since the end of July Fifth Army had been fighting in the Flanders Offensive (the Third Battle of Ypres). The battery joined 65th HAG at 'International Corner' on 1 September, and took over battery positions behind 'Hammond's Corner'. This was a dangerous spot, being shelled every night, a number of casualties being suffered, especially among the RGA and Royal Flying Corps signallers when the battery command post was hit on two successive nights, while cartridge dumps were frequently blown up. After two weeks Maj Boulton was given permission to move the battery to a new position along the Pilckem road at 'Foch Farm'. Just as 'A' gun was brought up the enemy brought down a heavy barrage and the drivers struggled to control their horses before being ordered back, leaving the gun to be manhandled the last 50 yards (46 m). Later, a shell dropped into 'C' gun's pit, killing one gunner and wounding and burning several others when the cartridges caught fire.

The offensive was re-launched with the Battle of the Menin Road Ridge (20 September), supported by 65th HAG, though fine drizzle made observation impossible early on. It was followed by the battles of Polygon Wood (26 September), Broodseinde (4 October), Poelcappelle (9 October) and finally the First and Second Battle of Passchendaele (12 and 26 October) the batteries working hard to support each attack. Conditions for the artillery were by now very bad: British batteries were clearly observable from the German-held Passchendaele Ridge and suffered badly from CB fire, while their own guns sank into the mud and became difficult to aim and fire. In mid-October 142nd Hvy Bty moved up to old German gun positions near 'Kitchener's Wood', where the detachments had some captured pillboxes for shelter. The fighting died down after 10 November. In early December 142nd sent a half battery forward to Zillebeke, where the accommodation was worse that at Kitchener's Wood, being 'nothing but mud and shell-holes'

142nd Heavy Bty came under 79th HAG from 18 December 1917. By now HAG allocations were becoming more fixed, and on 1 February 1918 they were converted into permanent RGA brigades once again. 79th HAG became 79th (Mixed) Brigade, with two heavy batteries armed with 60-pdrs and four siege batteries armed with 6-inch, 8-inch and 9.2-inch howitzers. 142nd Heavy Bty remained with 79th Bde until the end of the war. When it joined, the brigade was part of Second Army in the northern part of the Ypres Salient, but on 22 December, Fourth Army HQ took over from Second. It reverted to Second Army before the German spring offensive began on 21 March 1918.

=== Spring Offensive ===
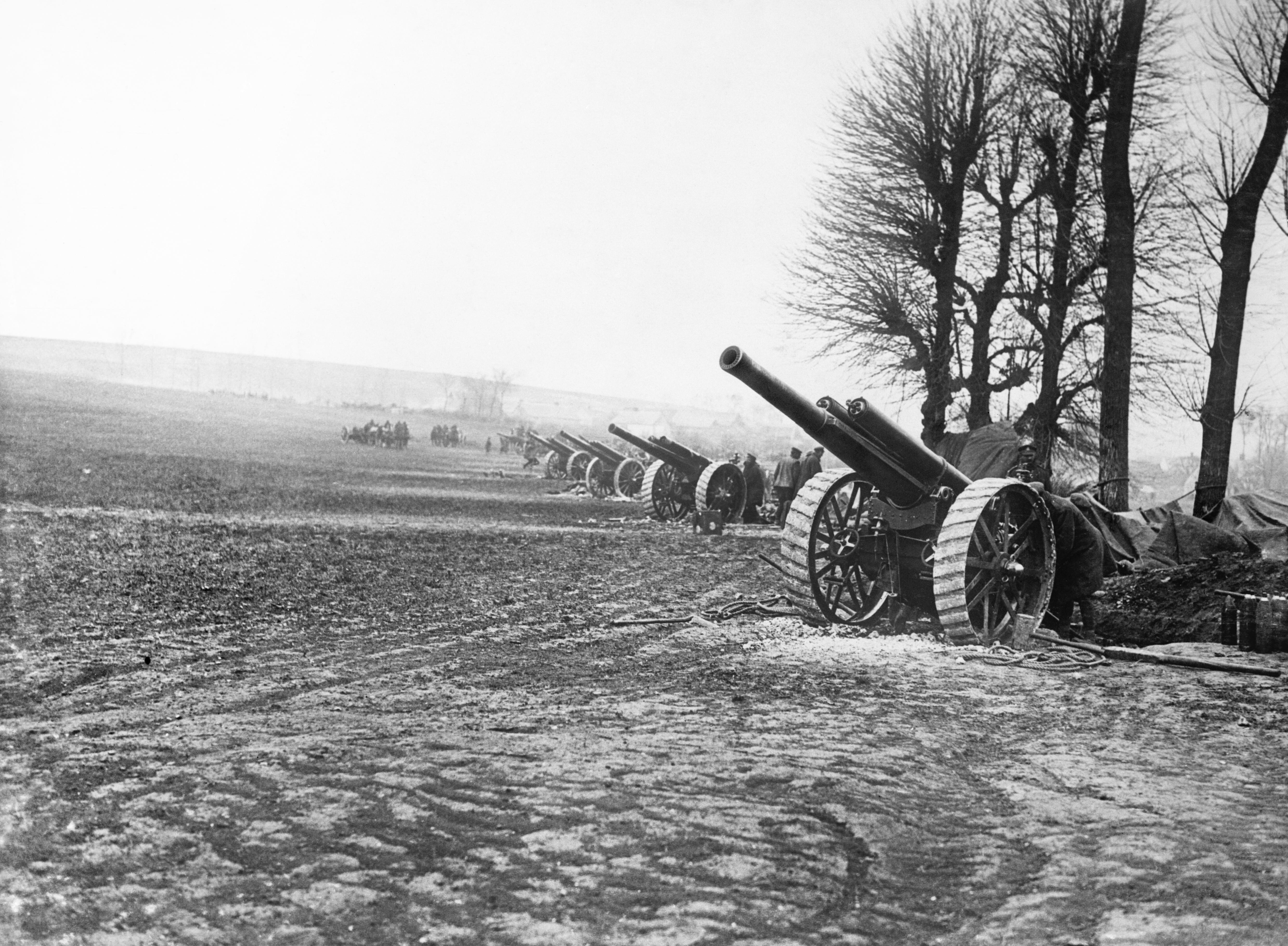
A 60-pounder battery deployed in the open during the German Spring Offensive, 1918.

The German offensive struck Third and Fifth Armies, and soon Second Army was ordered to send reinforcements south to help them. 142nd Heavy Bty began the journey to the Arras sector on 26 March, arriving at Gouy-Servins two days later. Here it waited for orders for 10 days before moving further south and coming into action south of Roclincourt. However, on 15 April the brigade was sent north again to the Armentières sector to reinforce First Army which had been hit by the second phase of the Spring Offensive, the Battle of the Lys. The brigade's mobile 60-pdr batteries (142nd and 1/1st Essex) marched via Aire and came into action at Morbecque at 15.00 on 17 April. They registered their guns and began CB and HF fire in support of XI Corps, which was defending the Forêt de Nieppe. By the night of 21/22 April the situation in front of the Forêt de Nieppe had stabilised. The Germans began nightly bombardments with mustard gas shells to drive 5th Division out. However the division had strong artillery support including 79th Bde RGA, which replied vigorously to the attack, bombarding the German billets and gun positions each night, and continuing harassing fire (HF) shoots throughout the day. The German offensive on this front ended on 29 April.

At this time many of the personnel of 142nd Hvy Bty were temporarily out of action with 'Morbecque Fever', which may have been an outbreak of the Spanish flu pandemic then affecting all armies. In mid-May 79th Bde shifted a short distance from Morbecque to Thiennes in front of Aire. On 20 May the batteries covered a raid by 95th Infantry Bde by neutralising enemy batteries and strongpoints. Otherwise the batteries continued CB shoots with aircraft observation and HF taks at night. During June 79th Bde moved sections of its heavy batteries up to forward positions, some of them among the field gun batteries. On 28 June it supported XI Corps in Operation Borderland, a limited counter-attack on La Becque and other fortified farms in front of the Forest of Nieppe, in what was described as 'a model operation' for artillery cooperation. 79th Brigade then transferred with XI Corps to the command of the reconstituted Fifth Army on 1 July 1918.

On 12 July 142nd Hvy Bty marched out of its positions to Coxyde on the coast where the brigade was sent for a month's intensive training. On 1 August the brigade was ordered to join the reconstituted Fourth Army, which was shortly to begin the final Allied Hundred Days Offensive. 142nd Heavy Bty entrained on 3 August for Vignacourt, and then marched to Amiens.

=== Hundred Days Offensive ===
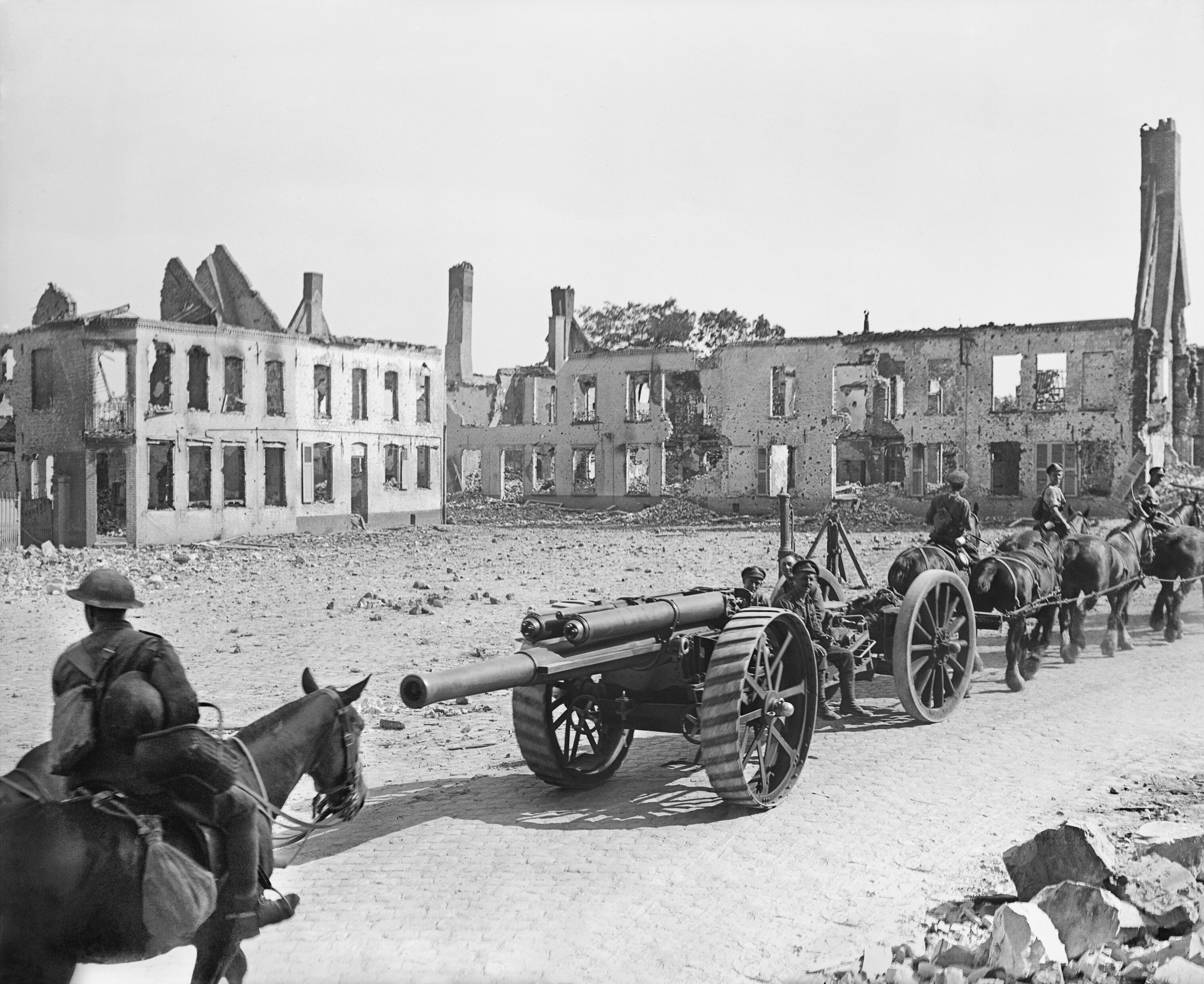
A 60-pounder moving up during the Hundred Days Offensive, 1918.

The offensive was launched with the Battle of Amiens. 142nd Heavy Bty had been positioned behind Canadian Corps on the extreme right of the attack, and had constructed gun platforms in Gentelles Wood. The battery then remained silent until Zero, at 04.20 on 8 August, when all the guns of Fourth Army opened up without warning. By 09.30 the Canadian infantry, the tanks and cavalry had advanced so far that 142nd Hvy Bty was out of range. The battery commander went forward to reconnoitre a new position, while the guns remained by the roadside in case of a German counter-attack. On 10 August the battery advanced about 15 miles (24 km) to a position east of Vrély. After some effective shooting from this line the brigade was ordered on 11 August to pull out and move back to the Gentelles, but as 142nd Hvy Bty was near Caix its wagon lines were heavily shelled with one fatal casualty. A number of non-commissioned officers were later decorated for gallantry in getting the horses to safety. As the enemy continued to retreat the battery moved forward by bounds across the ground devastated by the Germans in 1917, and at the end of the month came into action just short of Péronne. After 'Forty-eight hours heavy work' in this position, the brigade was ordered to fire off all its spare ammunition, and the battery was pulled back to the Amiens area for a week's rest.

On 14 September 142nd Hvy Bty was ordered to get into action at Vermand as soon was possible, which entailed two forced marches. While reconnoitring the new position Maj Boulton was wounded and evacuated; Capt C.W.N. Fox of 1/1st Essex Hvy Bty succeeded him and was promoted to Acting Major. The gun teams had a long night journey over torn up recently-captured ground and the battery struggled to get the guns into position and ammunition up during a thunderstorm and under 'lively' enemy fire. On 17 September the enemy launched a heavy gas attack, and followed it up by repeated bombing raids. The battery suffered a number of casualties, all the while its guns were firing almost continuously on support tasks for an attack by IX Corps (the Battle of Épehy). The attack went in at 05.20 on 18 September, and 79th Bde's batteries fired CB tasks until 09.49. That afternoon the guns were turned onto assembly points for enemy troops and bridge approaches, and then fired to help break up a German counter-attack. On 24 September IX Corps put in an attack with 1st and 6th Divisions on the 'Quadrilateral' and Fresnoy-le-Petit. Onve again 79th Bde was engaged in CB fire and responding to SOS calls, then on HF tasks. The following day its batteries moved forward to new positions by sections.

By the end of September Fourth Army had closed up to the Hindenburg Line. On 29 September IX Corps carried out an assault crossing of the St Quentin Canal, with 79th Bde amongst the mass of artillery supporting the operation. The canal defences had largely been destroyed by the heavy guns, which continued firing on the canal banks until the last possible moment as 137th (Staffordshire) Brigade stormed the outpost line and then scrambled across the canal in the morning mist. The objectives including Bellenglise were taken by 15.30. 79th Brigade moved its battery positions forward to the canal at Bellenglise during the night of 30 September/1 October.

On 3 October, IX Corps attacked the next German defensive position, the Beaurevoir Line, supported by 79th Bde, whose batteries then moved up to positions near Pontruet. Before the Battle of Cambrai on 8 October, harassing fire was carried out on the night of 6/7 October, and all through 7 October and up to Zero the heavies carried out CB fire and shelled important localities. Once the attack by 1st and 6th Divisions went in the heavies continued intense CB and long-range HF fire until the infantry were on the objectiveand the enemy were out of range of the 60-pdrs. The advance continued as Fourth Army pursued the beaten enemy towards the River Selle. IX Corps captured Bohain on 10 October and it became 79th Bde's HQ the following day. On 12 October the brigade supported the attack on the line Mennevret–Saint-Souplet, bombarding hostile batteries and strongpoints around Vaux-Andigny. 142nd Heavy Bty followed the infantry so closely that it ran into the tail end of the enemy's defensive barrage.

Preparations now began for IX Corps' assault on the German line along the Selle. CB fire began on 13 October, but mist and rain disrupted air reconnaissance on 15 and 16 October. However, Zero for the Battle of the Selle was fixed on 16 October for 05.20 the next day. The first day of the battle went well, one German counter-attack being broken up when all available guns were turned onto it, but the attackers were still short of their objective, the Sambre Canal. Steady progress was also made on the second and third days as Fourth Army closed up to the canal.

IX Corps renewed its advance on 23 October, with 79th Bde part of a massive corps artillery reserve. The attack went in at 01.20 in moonlight, after the heavy guns had done the usual CB and HF bombardments, and the results were extremely satisfactory. As the regimental historian relates, 'The guns of Fourth Army demonstrated, on 23 October, the crushing effect of well co-ordinated massed artillery. they simply swept away the opposition'. After a pause to regroup and reconnoitre, IX Corps stormed across the canal on 4 November (the Battle of the Sambre). 142nd and 1/1st Essex Heavy Btys had each pushed a section up almost to the Sambre Canal. After that the campaign became a pursuit of a beaten enemy, in which the slow-moving heavy guns could play little part. 79th Brigade parked its guns reacdy to advance again if called upon, but the war ended with the Armistice with Germany on 11 November.

=== Post-Armistice ===
After the Armistice, 79th Brigade was ordered on 15 November to transfer to IV Corps, which had been selected as part of the force that would carry out the Allied occupation of the Rhineland. The brigade's batteries moved to Viesly, where it was billeted to prepare for the march. In the end IV Corps was not sent to Germany, and after a month at Viesly 79th Bde moved up to the Nivelles area to take up winter quarters, with 142nd Hvy Bty at Villers-la-Ville. Demobilisation began in December, beginning with coalminers and other men in critical trades. Major Fox left 142nd Hvy Bty on 22 February 1919, and Maj H.E.O'B. Traill transferred from 117th Hvy Bty to take over the command on 11 April. The brigade finally left its winter quarters on 24 April and began their march to Germany, crossing the frontier on 30 April. Brigade HQ was established at Kuchenheim, near the Bonn brideghead over the Rhine with 79th Bde under the command of IX Corps once more. The two heavy batteries took up their quarters at Dreiborn on 2 May. It was noted that demobilisation had progressed so far that 142nd Hvy Bty was a mere skeleton by now, and very few of the original Durham men remained with the battery. Demobilisation continued after the Treaty of Versailles was signed, and units were reduced to cadres preparatory to repatriation.

After its return to the UK the battery was disbanded at Sandling in Kent on 11 October 1919.

== Memorial ==
There is a memorial window at St Hilda's Church, Hartlepool, 'in memory of the officers, non-commissioned officers and gunners of the Durham Royal Garrison Artillery who fell in the Great War 1914–1918'.

A printed roll of honour lists the names of 29 members of the 142nd (Durham) Heavy Battery (including attached signallers) who were killed on active service.
