= 134th (Cornwall) Heavy Battery, Royal Garrison Artillery =

134th (Cornwall) Heavy Battery, RGA 546th Siege Battery, RGA
- Cap Badge of the Royal Regiment of Artillery
- Active: July 1915–1918
- Country: United Kingdom
- Branch: Territorial Force
- Role: Heavy artillery
- Part of: Royal Garrison Artillery
- Garrison/HQ: Padstow and Penzance
- Engagements: East African Campaign; Western Front

The 134th (Cornwall) Heavy Battery, Royal Garrison Artillery, was a howitzer battery of the Royal Garrison Artillery (RGA) formed during World War I from a coast defence unit of the Territorial Force in Cornwall. It served in the East African Campaign in 1916–17.

== Origin ==
134th (Cornwall) Heavy Battery was formed in July 1915 by Nos 1 (Padstow) and 2 (Penzance) Heavy Btys of the Cornwall (Duke of Cornwall's) Royal Garrison Artillery, a 'defended ports' coast defence unit of the pre-war part-time Territorial Force. It was one of only two all-TF heavy field batteries raised from defended ports units. (Note: The other was the 142nd (Durham) Heavy Bty, which served on the Western Front.) It went to Woolwich about 250 strong on 12 August, from where it supplied reinforcements to RGA units fighting on the Western Front, at Gallipoli and in Egypt. On 20 November the battery was ordered to mobilise as a howitzer battery of the Royal Garrison Artillery for service in the East African Campaign. (Note: The battery is occasionally referred to as '134th (Cornwall) Howitzer Battery' rather that 'Heavy Battery'.) With a strength of 124 all ranks it embarked at Southampton on 26 December 1915, arriving at Mombasa on 1 February 1916. At Maktau it took over four Indian Army pattern 5.4-inch howitzers, which were drawn by oxen. 633 Company Army Service Corps was formed on 12 January 1916 as the Ammunition Column (Motor Transport) for the battery.

== Service ==
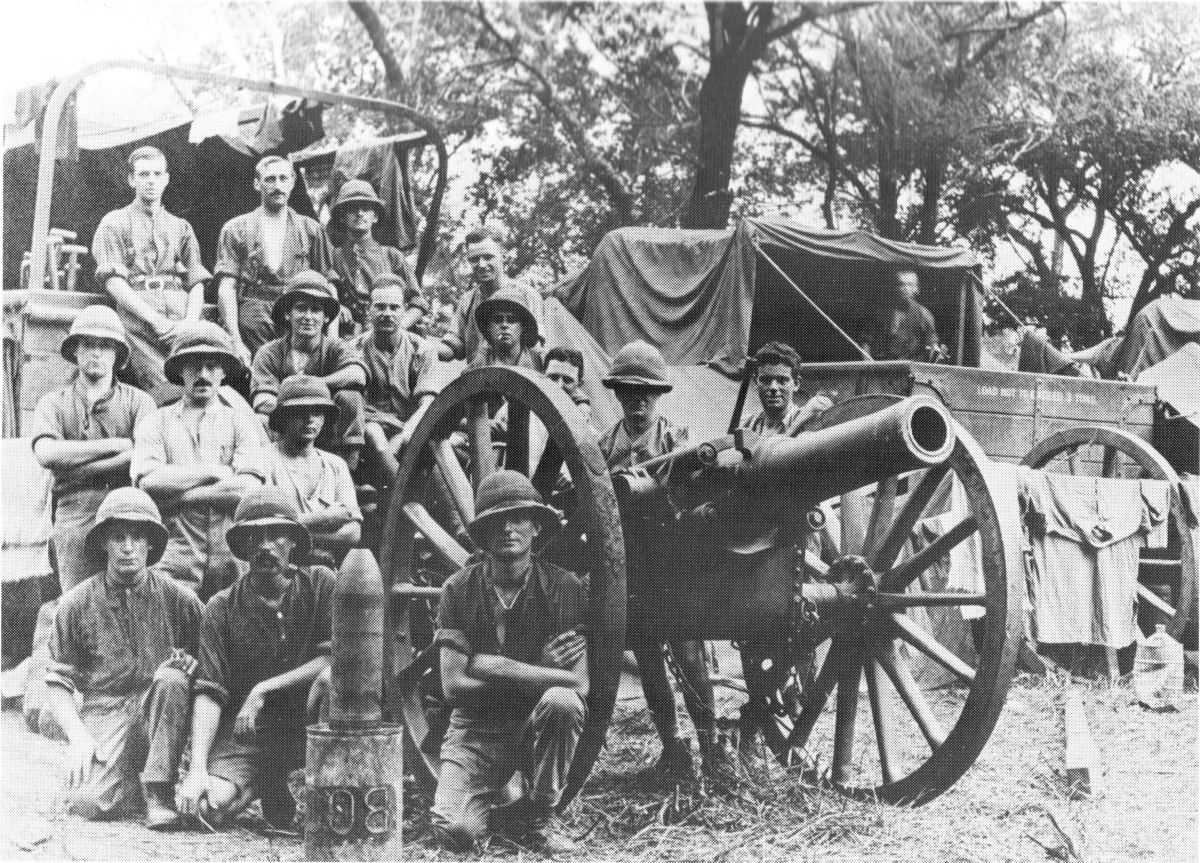
5.4-inch howitzer and crew at Morogoro, 1916–17.

=== Latema Nek ===
On 5 March the battery received orders to join in the Kilimanjaro offensive with 2nd Division of the East African Expeditionary Force. It moved out via the Serengeti rail head and on 9 March took part in a demonstration against Salaita Hill (where the Imperial forces had been repulsed the previous month). Its first position was out of range of the enemy positions because of inaccurate maps. However, it moved forward and engaged the hill with Lyddite shells until the infantry reached the top. Next day it crossed the drift on the Lumi River and on 11 March it fired in support of an attack on Latema Hill (the Battle of Latema Nek). After the German withdrawal the battery bivouacked at Taveta and then at Himo until May.

On 21 May the battery began a long march along the Pangani River as part of the Force Reserve. It also manned the ammunition column for the 13th Howitzer Bty (a section of 11th (Hull) Heavy Bty, RGA), whose 5-inch howitzers were towed by lorries but relied on oxen for ammunition supply. For part of June the gunners were employed in road-making, then marched with the force reserve in a wide turning movement. Once back on the road the battery had to wait for its lorries to bring up supplies while its smiths and fitters worked to repair the German light railway. It spent July camped at Lukigura Bridge and then Msiha. The battery was never deployed 'in action' during this whole time, though it was sometimes under fire from longer-ranged German guns.

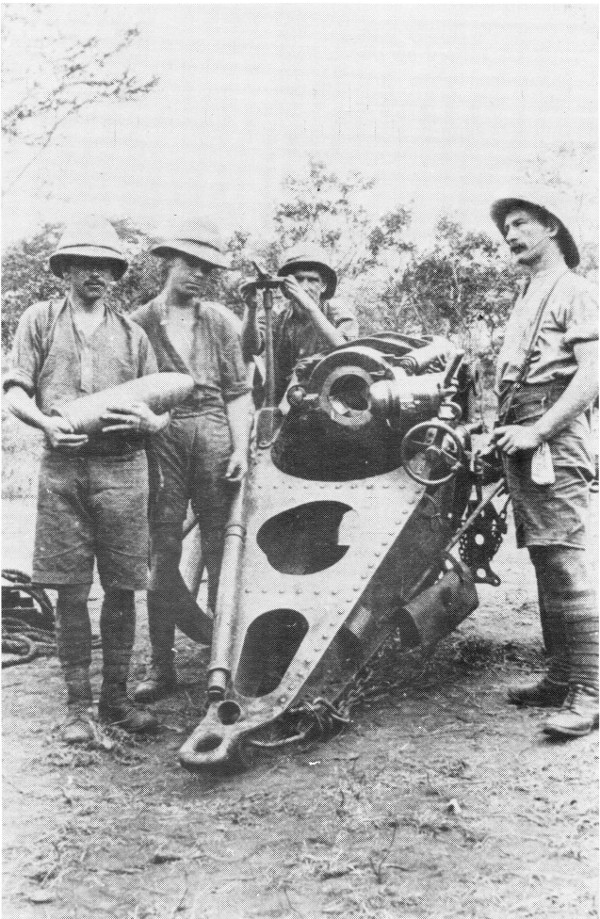
Breech of a 5.4-inch howitzer.

=== Morogoro camp ===
During August the battery supported the 1st East African Brigade, which was to attack Ruhungo, but flanking moves caused the Germans to retire and the guns were not needed. During the month the battery moved via Turiani and Dakawa to the Mgerengere River. On 28 August it reached Morogoro. Here the offensive was halted by rain, exhaustion and German defences on the River Mgeta, so the force camped and reorganised. The battery commander was appointed post commandant of Morogoro and the battery carried out garrison duty in the town until 20 December, while the motor transport section brought up supplies and ammunition for the force.

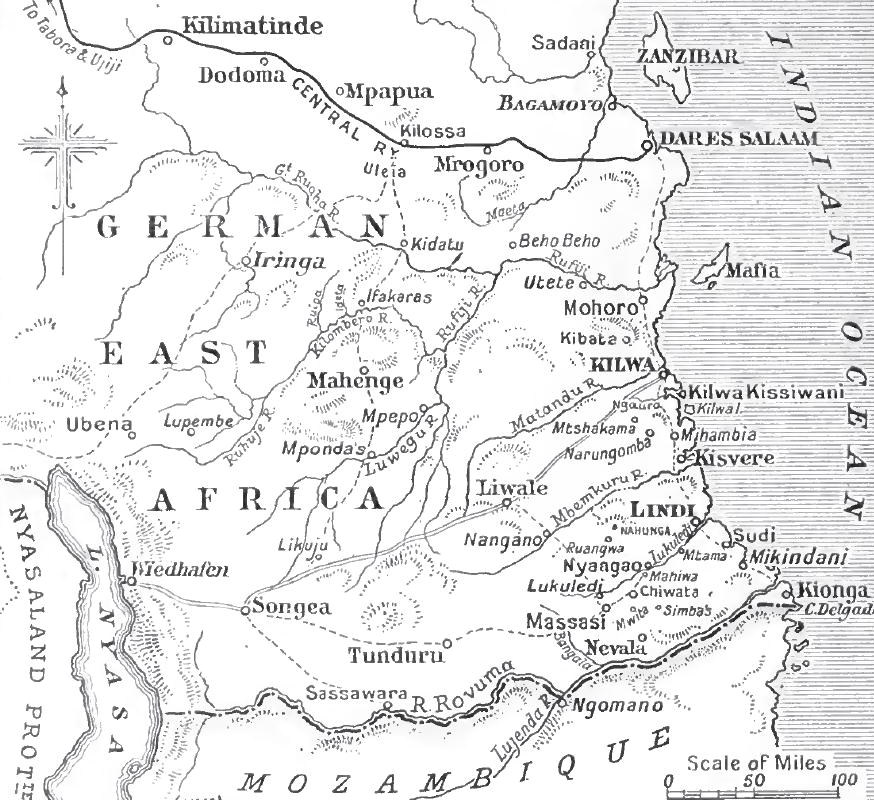
German East Africa 1914–18.

=== Tanganyika ===
On 20 December the battery left Morogoro on a three-day march to Duthumi, where it stayed for the rest of the month. On 31 December it moved into prepared positions about 500 yards (460 m) behind the front line trenches and established an observation post (OP) on Kitoho Hill. The following day it opened fire to support the Nigerian Brigade's attack, but having ranged on the German trenches, the forward observation officer (FOO) with the Nigerians could see nothing, though reporting heavy rifle fire from a flank. That position was shelled, and the enemy were seen leaving. The battery then 'searched' the ground in front of the Nigerians, lifting its fire as they advanced. When the infantry reached the Mgeta river they found the bridge commanded by two Maxim gun positions; they withdrew a little and two of the battery's guns opened fire on these machine guns while the remainder fired on trenches and a wooded donga. At 16.30 the battery was ordered to advance towards the river as soon as the Nigerian Brigade considered it advisable. The battery could only get 1,000 yards (910 m) forward, and prepared to fire from this position at long range. However, the enemy were in retreat and the battery camped for the night. During the engagement one of the battery's guns suffered a premature shell burst, which blew away 6 inches (15 cm) of the muzzle, killing one gunner and wounding three others.

The battery remained at Duthumi until 14 February 1917, when it was ordered to march back to the railway, arriving at Mikesse on 18 February. Here it handed in one of its remaining 5.4-inch howitzers and proceeded to Dar es Salaam. On 1 March it was ordered to send a detachment of one officer and 21 men with one howitzer to Lindi. The detachment boarded the SS Barjora and arrived at Lindi on 5 March, establishing their gun position on Kitolo Hill as part of the defences for Lindi. The rest of the battery moved from Dar es Salaam back to Morogoro at the end of March for training.

At Lindi the detachment had no transport for their howitzer, but they crewed a 4-inch gun for the Royal Marine Artillery and a 3.7-inch trench mortar, and did some mortar and Grenade training for parties from the King's African Rifles (KAR), West Indies Regiment and 5th Light Infantry of the Indian Army.

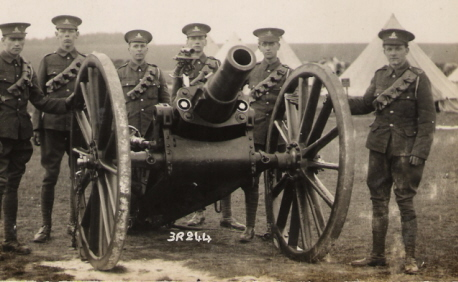
Territorial gunners training with a 5-inch howitzer before World War I.

On 28 May 134th (Cornwall) Bty at Morogoro handed its two remaining 5.4-inch howitzers over to 11th (Hull) Heavy Bty for training, and took over a 5-inch howitzer from that battery. It then returned to Dar es Salaam and on 11 July took the Barjora to Lindi, where the detachment also handed in its 5.4-inch howitzer. Leaving some men to operate a Stokes mortar battery, the rest of 134th Hvy Bty (32 all ranks) with their 5-inch howitzer, were taken by a Tugboat to Mingoyo, where they bivouacked at Lower Schaadel Farm with an escort from the KAR. They adapted two Flat wagons so that the howitzer and its limber could be moved along the German light railway, hauled by local porters.

=== Advance from Lindi ===
The Lindi Column began probing forward at the beginning of August and from 1 to 11 August there was a prolonged action against the enemy at Tandimuti Hill, with the howitzer firing in conjunction with the monitors HMS Mersey and Severn firing from offshore. The battery then advanced about 6 miles (9.7 km) along the rail line to a new camp, and on each of the next few days moved out to various positions for shoots on Narunyu on the bank of the Lukuledi River. On 27 August the 5-inch was registered on various targets with the aid of an observation aircraft, and then took part in a general bombardment, firing 10 rounds at each of the registered targets. That evening the 5.4-inch howitzer was brought up from Lindi to rejoin the battery. On 29 and 30 August both howitzers and the Stokes mortars fired at targets to try to get the enemy to reveal their positions, despite a large number of misfires from the old 5.4-inch. On 31 August the 5-inch bombarded Nirunge Hill, from where an enemy patrol had been harassing the KAR picquets. On most days in September one or both howitzers went out to shell Kilossa Ridge or the enemy-held bomas and trenches in front of Narunyu.

The Lindi Column was now reinforced. On 15 September, 11th (Hull) Hvy Bty's last 5-inch howitzer arrived from Morogoro for 134th Hvy Bty, together with the rest of 134th's men who had been at Morogoro and two of its Napier lorries.

Lindi Column resumed its advance against Narunyu on 23 September, with one column making a two-day flank march to cross the Lukuledi while the battery bombarded the German positions. The flank move caused the Germans to abandon their positions. The roads were impassable for the heavy lorries, so the two howitzers with the force reserve (one 5-inch had blown out an oil pipe in its recoil mechanism) had to move up on their railway trollies to the end of the line at Mtua (28 September) and then be dragged forward by porters while light Ford cars brought up ammunition. On 30 September the guns were in position but the Germans had already retired out of range. Thereafter the battery took part in No 3 Column's pursuit, still dragged by porters until the Napiers caught up on 2 October. On 5 October the battery bombarded the high ground across the Nyengedi River, exchanging fire with a German gun. Daily firing continued as the column obtained a bridgehead, and then pushed the German rearguards back.

=== Mahiwa ===
Between 15 and 18 October, the Lindi Column fought the Battle of Mahiwa, one of the bloodiest battles of the whole campaign, with the battery firing a large number of rounds in support of the failed attack. However, the German force had also lost heavily, and it began a retirement towards Portuguese Mozambique, harried by a few howitzer rounds each day, though spotting fall of shot in the dense bush was problematic because of wireless difficulties with the Royal Naval Air Service observation aircraft. The battery reached Ndanda on 16 November.

=== Return to England ===
German East Africa had been cleared, and the remaining German forces adopted guerrilla tactics in Mozambique. The Allied forces had to reorganise for this phase of the campaign, and 134th Hvy Bty's slow-moving howitzers returned to Nyangao on the Lukuledi by the end of the month. In December the Lindi force was broken up and all of its exhausted and sickly British and Indian units were sent home. On 10 December 134th Hvy Bty was ordered back to Lindi. It boarded the SS Salamis for Dar es Salaam, where its remaining guns were handed in.

On 19 December 1917, 134th (Cornwall) Heavy Battery, with 5 officers and 59 other ranks, embarked on the SS Caronia at Dar es Salaam en route for Durban and then England. 633 MT Company remained in Africa as a transport company.

== 546th Siege Battery, RGA ==
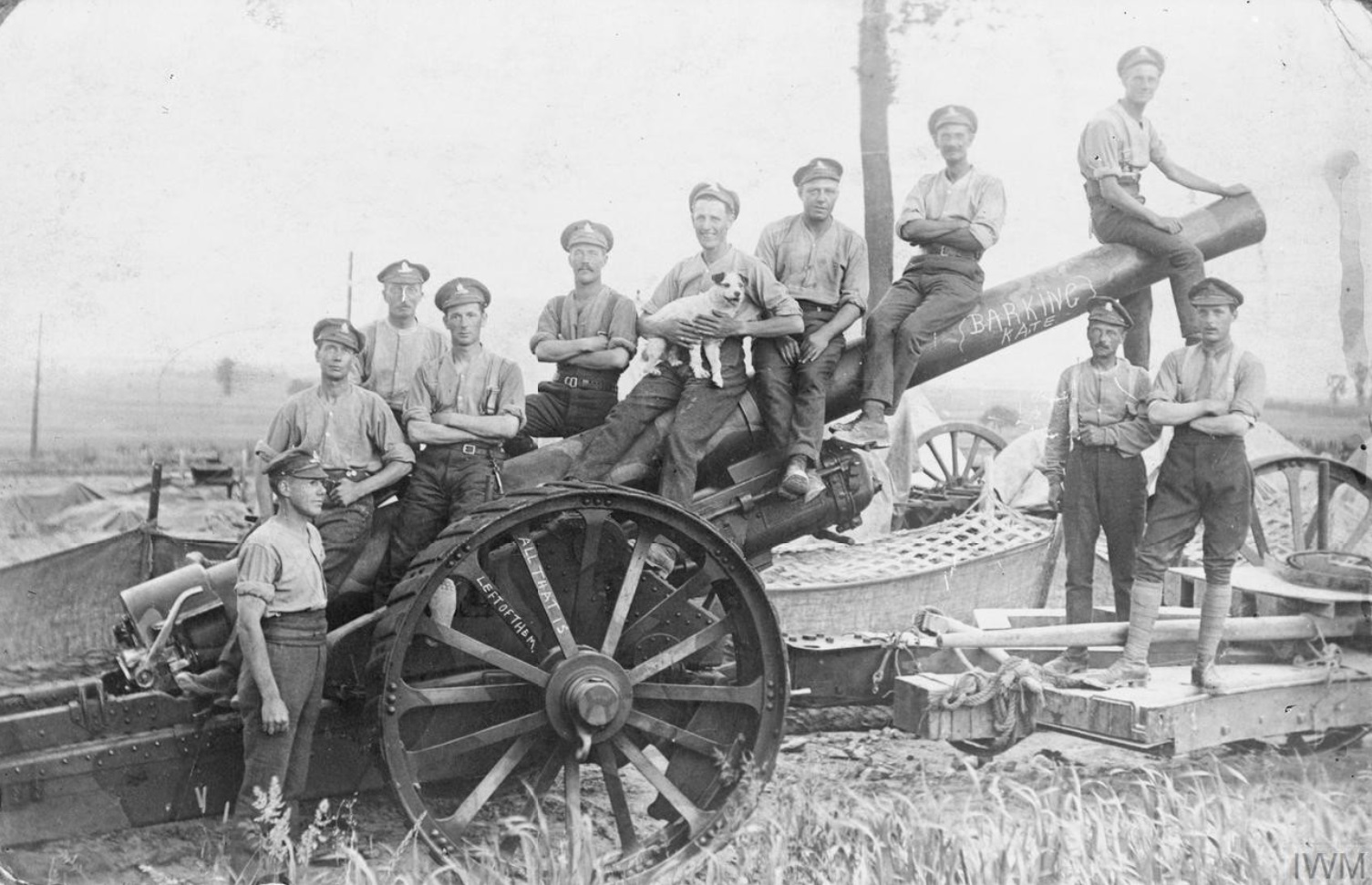
6-inch Mk XIX gun of an RGA siege battery.

Once they returned to England, the veterans of 11th (Hull) Heavy Bty had reformed as 545th Siege Battery, RGA, and served as a 6-inch gun battery on the Western Front in the final months of the war. Similarly, the men of 134th (Cornwall) Hvy Bty were reorganised into 546th Siege Battery on 27 February 1918. This was one of only two TF siege batteries formed during the war, the other being the 309th formed by the Honourable Artillery Company. The 546th was also the last RGA siege battery to be sent overseas during World War I, reaching the Western Front on 22 August 1918. (Note: Veterans from 13th Hvy Bty in 546th Siege Bty probably included Gnr Joseph Prowse, named on St Buryan War Memorial and Cpl Richard Gardner from Cornwall,)

On 25 August 546th Siege Bty was equipped with four 6-inch guns (probably the modern Mk XIX version issued to 545th Bty) and it served with Second Army until the Armistice with Germany. It was apparently disbanded before the end of 1918.

== External sources ==
- Great War Forum
- Land Forces of Britain, the Empire and Commonwealth – Regiments.org (archive site)
- Roll of Honour
