= Carolyn Hardy =

Horticulturalist

- Born: 16 June 1930; Richmond, Yorkshire, England
- Died: 23 September 2016 (aged 86)
- Education: Wye College, Kent, UK
- Spouse: Alan Hardy
- Children: 2
- Awards: OBE VMH

Carolyn Hardy OBE (16 June 1930-23 September 2016) was a British horticulturalist. She chaired the National Gardens Scheme (1979-1986) and was vice-chair of the Royal Horticultural Society for 10 years.

== Personal life ==
Carolyn Evanson was born on 16 June 1930 in Richmond, Yorkshire, UK. She studied horticulture at Wye College, Kent (1949-1952). In 1952 she married Alan Hardy, and lived with him at Sandling Park in Kent. They had two daughters. She died 23 September 2016, after suffering from Alzheimer's disease in her last decade.

== Horticultural career ==
The Sandling Park estate already had a reputation for rare trees and shrubs, and the Hardys developed it further as well as both becoming well known in the horticultural world. She particularly introduced ground cover plants to contrast with trees. The gardens were seriously damaged in the Great Storm of 1987 with many trees destroyed, but the Hardys began clearance and replanting that continued for many years.

They exhibited at Royal Horticultural Society shows and became involved in the organisation of the society. Carolyn Hardy was a member of the RHS Governing Council 1985 – 1997, member of many RHS committees and was Vice-Chair of the RHS for 10 years (2006 - 2016). She was a moderniser, involved in widening the range of people involved with the RHS.

However, before her work for the Royal Horticultural Society, she had been involved with the UK charity National Gardens Scheme. She was the county organiser for Kent in 1971 (until 1979) and then in 1972 she joined its governing council, finally serving as the Chair from 1979 until 1986. She led the transformation of the National Gardens Scheme to an independent charity in 1980 from its origin as a fund-raising enterprise of the Queen's Nursing Institute supporting district nurses in 1927. Many more gardens joined the scheme, with the proceeds going to support additional nursing charities such as Macmillan Cancer Support and Marie Curie. She was made an Honorary Life Vice President on retiring as Chair of the National Gardens Scheme.

== Awards ==
She was awarded the Royal Horticultural Society's most distinguished award, the Victoria Medal of Honour (VMH) in 1989 and the Order of the British Empire in 1998 for services to horticulture. Several plant varieties have been named after her including Dianthus 'Carolyn Hardy' and Deutzia hookeriana 'Carolyn Hardy'.
