= Brockhill Country Park =

Park in Kent, England

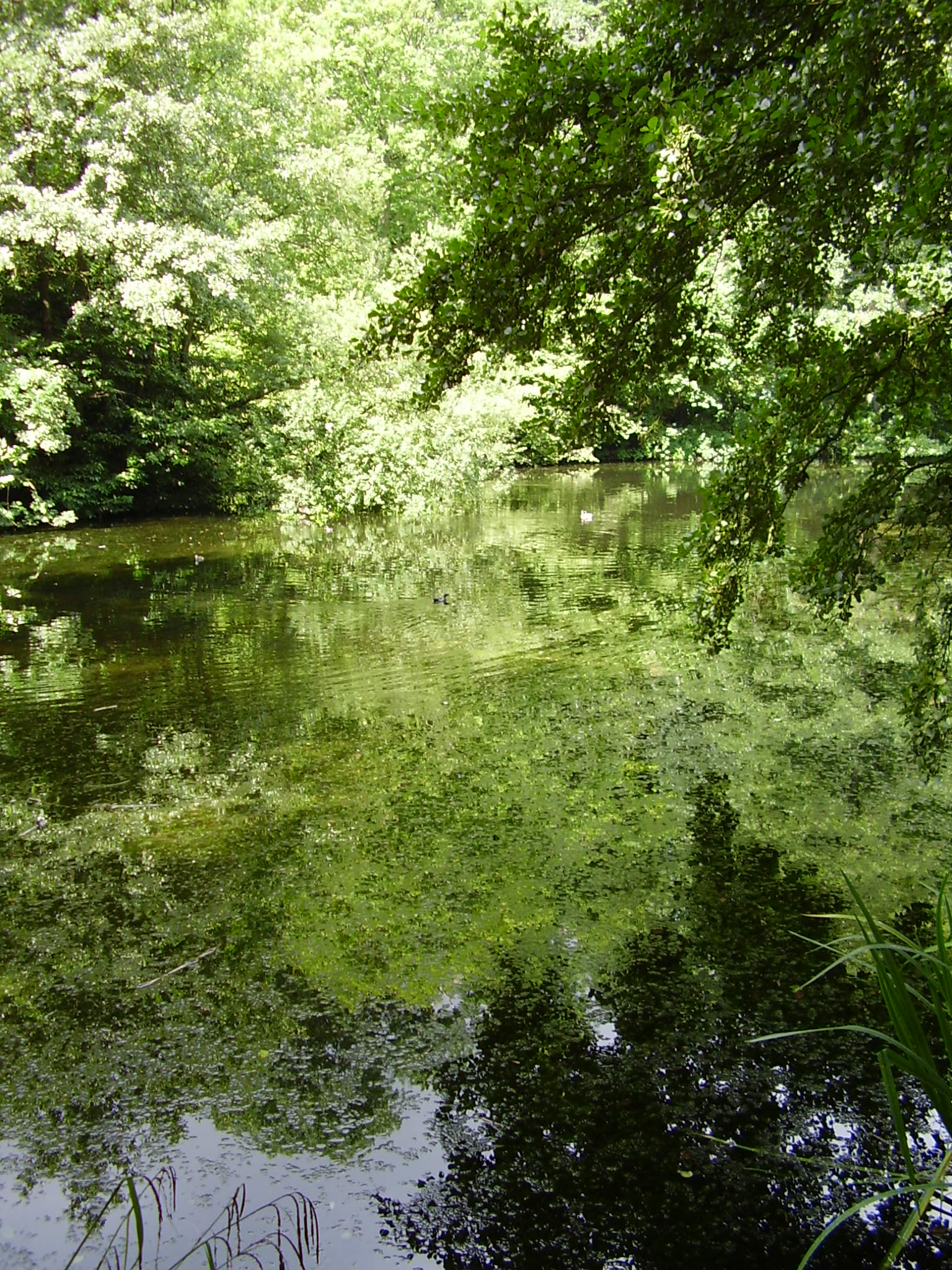
- Brockhill Lake

- Location within Kent
- OS grid: TR148359
- Coordinates: 51°04′55″N 1°03′54″E
- Area: 54 acres (220,000 m^{2})
- Created: 1987
- Operator: Kent County Council,
- Status: Open 7 days a week, dawn until dusk
- Website: www.kent.gov.uk/leisure_and_culture/countryside_and_coast/parks_and_open_spaces/country_parks/brockhill_country_park.aspx

Brockhill Country Park is in Saltwood, near Hythe in Kent, England. The park was a former estate with landscaped gardens and has subsequently been sub-divided. The house now forms the main building for a performing arts college, whilst the gardens and lake now form part of the country park.

== History ==
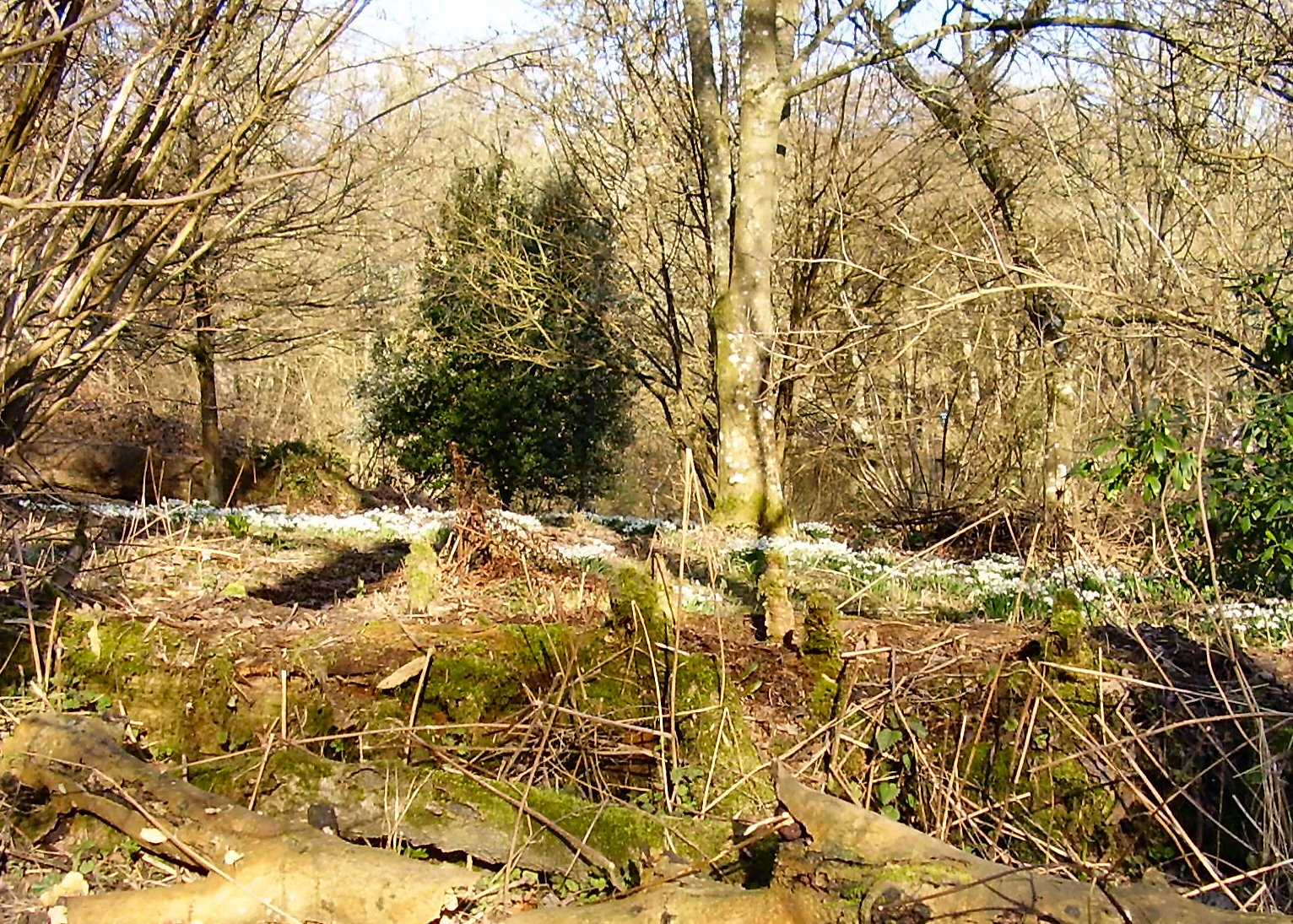
Brockhill's Snowdrops in the Spring

It was previously once part of a large estate, dating back to Norman times. The old manor house is adjacent to the park. This was once Brockhill Park, now used as the main building of Brockhill Park Performing Arts College. The estate is connected with the Tourney family, until the death of the eccentric William Tourney Tourney (the last Lord of Brockhill Manor) in 1903. Who seems to have a reputation for world travel and oddness as well as gaining an extra Tourney (to his name!). Upon his death, he is said to have ordered that his constant companions, his dog and his horse, were to be killed and buried with him. The grave of the dog is next to William's on an island in the middle of one of the lakes, that are now part in Brockhill Country Park. Saltwood Church has references to Thomas Brokhill 1437, Thomas Tourney 1712, Mary Tourney (early 19th Century) and another Thomas Tourney in 1816.

== Geography ==
The rest of the park, 54 acres (220,000 m^{2}), is dominated by a large grassy valley, bisected by the Brockhill Stream, as it makes its way down to the Royal Military Canal in Hythe and has excellent views (from the park) to the English Channel. There are two sign posted trails around the park ranging from 3 – 6 miles (5–9.6 km) long, the walks are linked to the Saxon Shore Way, offering potential routes for long-distance walkers. The lake trail takes up to 30 minutes (accessed by a sloped path), whilst the valley walk takes about 45 minutes and offers a scenic route around the valley at the southern end of the site. As well as leading around the Deer Paddock which is a meadow enclosed with trees, including walnut and variegated sycamore. To the north, a short walk leads to Postling Down, an area of unimproved ancient chalk downland. The rabbit-grazed turf is ideal for low-growing herbs and the rich mosaic of plants, providing shelter for many beautiful meadow butterflies.

The park is a Site of Nature Conservation Interest.
