= Brockhill Park Performing Arts College =

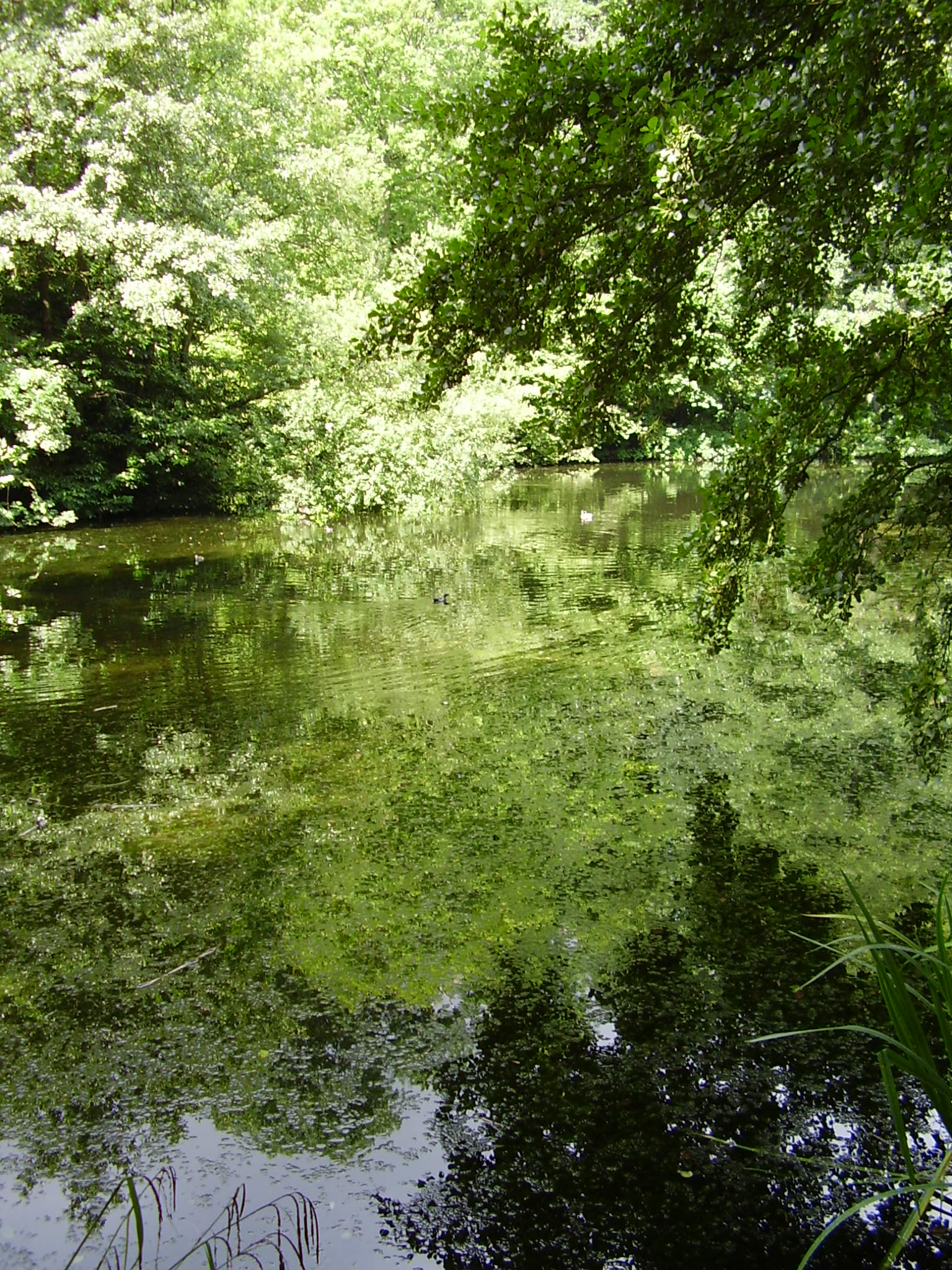

Location
- Sandling Road; Hythe, Kent, CT21 4HL; England; 51.0813°N 1.0674°E

Information
- Type: Academy
- Established: 1 September 2011
- Department for Education URN: 137458 Tables
- Ofsted: Reports
- Head teacher: Charles Joseph
- Gender: Coeducational
- Age: 11 to 18
- Website: https://www.brockhill.kent.sch.uk/

Brockhill Park Performing Arts College (BPPAC) is a coeducational secondary school and sixth form located in Saltwood, Kent near the coastal town of Hythe. The school is located next to Brockhill Country Park and includes a farm. Brockhill is known not only for its farm, but its performing arts status and tough cross country running course as well as its neighbouring country park. It is a specialist Performing Arts College with a rural dimension.
