= Saltwood =

Village in Kent, England

Coordinates: 51.0806°N 1.0776°E

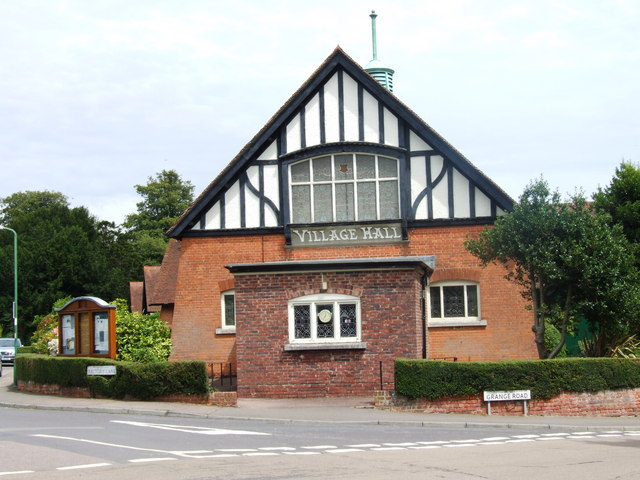
- Saltwood Village Hall

- Location within Kent
- Population: 850 (2011)
- District: Folkestone and Hythe
- Shire county: Kent
- Region: South East
- Country: England
- Sovereign state: United Kingdom
- Post town: HYTHE
- Postcode district: CT21
- Dialling code: 01303
- Police: Kent
- Fire: Kent
- Ambulance: South East Coast
- UK Parliament: Folkestone and Hythe

Saltwood is a village and civil parish in the Folkestone and Hythe District of Kent, England. Within the parish are the small hamlets of Pedlinge and Sandling.

== Geography ==
Saltwood is located immediately to the north of Hythe on the high land looking over the Romney Marsh. It is served by Sandling railway station on the South Eastern Main Line. It is surrounded by farming land.

The parish includes the hamlet of Sandling which has a railway station. It is the location of Sandling Park, a large estate and house, which stretches around the village of Saltwood and ends at Saltwood's other satellite hamlet, Pedlinge. The gardens of the Park are often open during the summer months.

== Castle ==
Saltwood Castle, once a possession of the Archbishops of Canterbury, is located here, having been assigned to them by a deed of 1026 (now in the British Museum) signed by such leading figures as King Canute and Earl Godwin. The castle was the overnight resting place of four knights (Reginald fitzUrse, Hugh de Morville, William de Tracy, and Richard le Breton) on their journey to Canterbury to murder Thomas Becket.

More recently this castle (now privately owned) has been home to Kenneth Clark, Lord Clark of Saltwood, and then his son Alan Clark MP. It is located about a mile to the north of the cinque port of Hythe, although the parish boundaries of Saltwood come very much closer to Hythe town centre.

== Religious buildings ==
The Norman parish church is dedicated to St Peter & St Paul. There is also an Anglican chapel of ease at Pedlinge. The residents of Sandling Park, the estate and their estate employees traditionally worship at the latter, which is served by the parish priest (rector) of Saltwood.

== Schools ==
There are two primary schools, Saltwood CEP, and St Augustine's RCP, as well as a major secondary comprehensive school, Brockhill Park Performing Arts College, located in the parish.

== Leisure ==
Brockhill Country Park is located here. Saltwood also has a Cricket team which plays in the Kent Village League's Second Division, and has a ground and pavilion in the village at Kiln Corner, on the top of Tanners Hill.

Until 1987 Saltwood attracted visitors to a historical point of interest, the Saltwood Miniature Railway, which was the oldest miniature railway in the world, still extant. However, in 1987 the railway closed. The locomotives and rolling stock were sold, and some time later the track was lifted. For about ten years it remained possible to follow the course of the line, but the entire site has now been redeveloped with new houses.

An inn of some antiquity trades on the village green. The Castle Hotel was first licensed as a public house in 1890 by the local Mackeson's Brewery, although there is evidence that beer was sold on the site for some time before that date.
