= Waechter baronets =

Extinct baronetcy in the Baronetage of the United Kingdom

The Waechter baronetcy, of Ramsnest in the Parish of Chiddingfold in the County of Surrey, was a title in the Baronetage of the United Kingdom. It was created on 13 February 1911 for the businessman and philanthropist Harry Waechter, son of Max Waechter, and managing director of Bessler, Waechter & Co.

He was succeeded by his son, the 2nd Baronet, on whose death in 1985 the title became extinct.

== Waechter baronets, of Ramsnest (1911) ==
- Sir Harry Waechter, 1st Baronet (1871–1929).
- Sir Harry Leonard d'Arcy Waechter, 2nd Baronet (1912–1985)

Baronetage of the United Kingdom
Preceded by Smith baronets	Waechter baronets of Ramsnest; 13 February 1911	Succeeded by Younger baronets
