= 3rd Middlesex Artillery Volunteers =

3rd Middlesex Artillery Volunteers 5th County of London Brigade, RFA 92nd (5th London) Field Regiment, RA 292 (5th London) Airborne Anti-Tank Regiment, RA
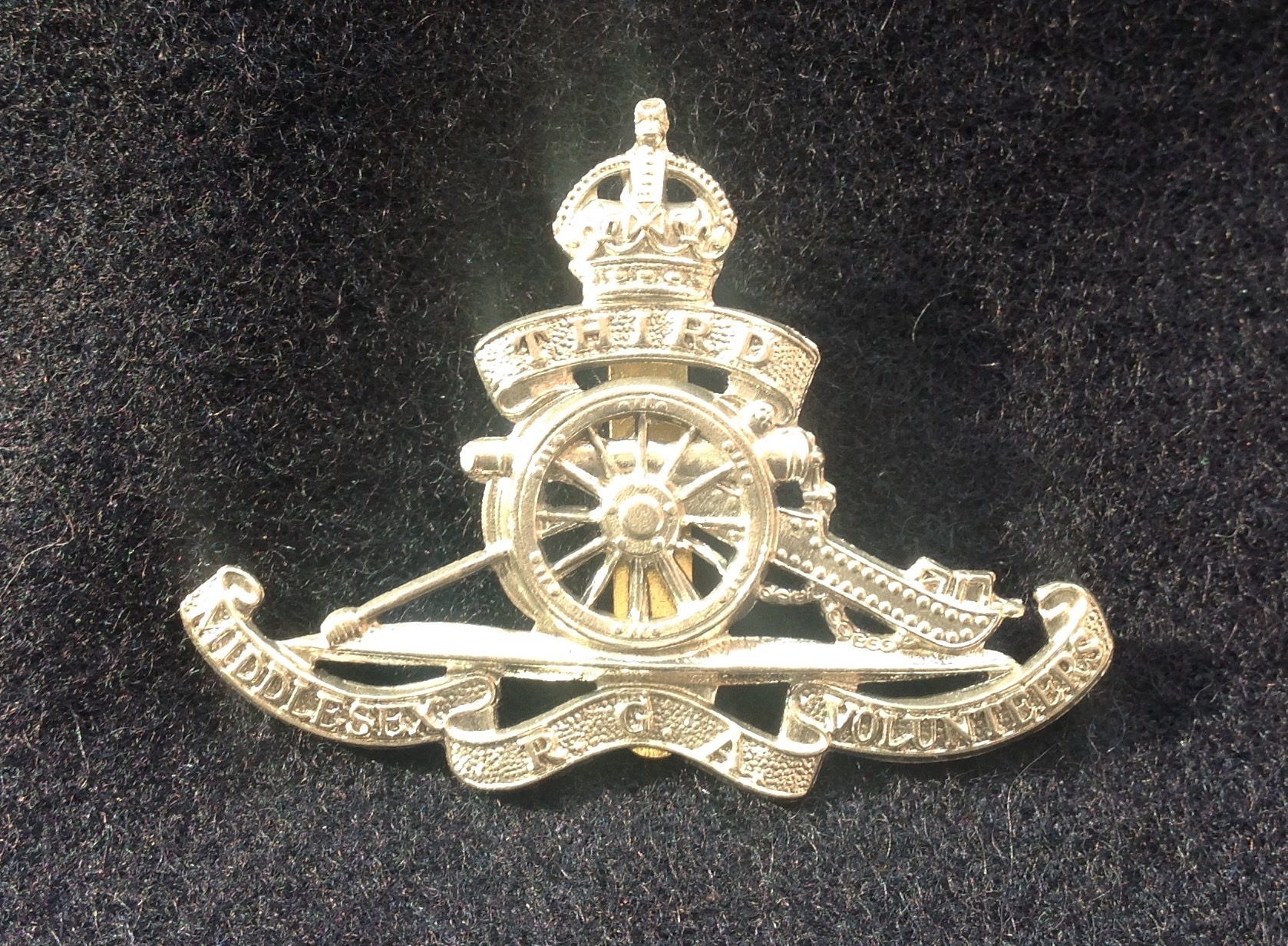
- Cap badge, 3rd Middlesex Royal Garrison Artillery (Volunteers), 1902-1908
- Active: 12 September 1861 – 31 October 1956
- Country: United Kingdom
- Branch: Territorial Army
- Type: Artillery Brigade/Regiment
- Role: Field Artillery; Airborne Artillery
- Garrison/HQ: Regent Street, Westminster; Kennington Lane, Lambeth
- Nicknames: Truro's Tigers; Paddington Light Horse Artillery
- Motto: Together Heave
- Engagements: First World War: Battle of Aubers Ridge; Battle of Festubert; Battle of Loos; Battle of the Somme; Battle of Messines; Battle of Cambrai; German spring offensive; Hundred Days Offensive; Second World War: Battle of Arras; Defence of Cassel; Operation Torch; Operation Husky; Operation Baytown; Crossing of the Garigliano; Battle of Anzio; Germany 1945

Commanders
- Notable commanders: Charles Wilde, 2nd Lord Truro

The Metropolitan Artillery Volunteers (popularly known as 'Truro's Tigers') was a part-time unit of the British Volunteer Force formed in the London area in 1861. It was designated the 3rd Middlesex Artillery Volunteers and went on to become the 5th London Brigade, Royal Field Artillery in the Territorial Force. It provided two active service units in the First World War, which saw action on the Western Front. Just before the Second World War it again spun off a duplicate regiment, each taking the '5th London' subtitle. Both regiments saw widely varied service during the war. The regiment later provided an airborne artillery unit in the Territorial Army of the 1950s.

== Volunteer Force ==
The enthusiasm for the Volunteer movement following an invasion scare in 1859 saw the creation of many Rifle, Artillery and Engineer Volunteer Corps composed of part-time soldiers eager to supplement the Regular British Army in time of need. One such unit was the Metropolitan Artillery Volunteers raised in Islington, North London, on 12 September 1861 by Charles Wilde, 2nd Lord Truro and known as 'Truro's Tigers'. (Note: Truro also raised the 2nd Middlesex Light Horse Volunteers.) It was numbered as the 3rd Middlesex Artillery Volunteer Corps (AVC), and competition to join was so great that it was able to set a minimum height standard of 5 foot 11 inches (1.8 m). The cost of maintaining guns and harness put pressure on the AVCs and a number of units began to decline after the first enthusiasm. In 1870 the 3rd Middlesex AVC absorbed the 4th (The Authors' Volunteer Horse Artillery) Middlesex AVC, originally raised at West Brompton Cricket Ground on 4 December 1865. Despite the problems that other volunteer artillery units suffered, the 3rd Middlesex went from strength to strength: by 1881, with Lord Truro still the Lieutenant-Colonel Commandant, it had become a full brigade organised as follows:

- Brigade Headquarters (HQ) at 111 Regent Street, later 16 Regent Street
- 1st Division at Armoury House, Farringdon Road, Clerkenwell
  - Nos 1–3 Batteries
- 2nd Division at 76 Lower Kennington Lane
  - Nos 4–7 and 11 Batteries
- 3rd Division at Porteus Road, Paddington – popularly known as the 'Paddington Light Horse Artillery'
  - Nos 8–10 and 12 Batteries
- Ambulance Detachment
- Cyclist Section

From June 1886 Brigade HQ was at 18 Cockspur Street, Charing Cross, and by 1899 at 1 Palace Place, Great Scotland Yard.

A number of early AVCs had manned semi-mobile 'position batteries' of smooth-bore field guns pulled by agricultural horses. Like all volunteer units the 3rd Middlesex conducted regular camps and took part in Volunteer reviews. In 1868 they attended the Volunteer review at Portsmouth, taking a horsed battery of 9-pounder smooth bore guns. However, the War Office (WO) refused to pay for the upkeep of field guns and the concept died out in the 1870s.

On 1 April 1882 the Volunteer Artillery were organised into large 'divisions' of the Royal Artillery (RA) along with Regular and Militia garrison artillery units: the 3rd Middlesex was assigned to the London Division. When on 1 July 1889 the artillery were regrouped into three large divisions, the 3rd Middlesex joined the Eastern Division. Volunteer artillery batteries were redesignated companies in 1891, reflecting their role as garrison artillery.

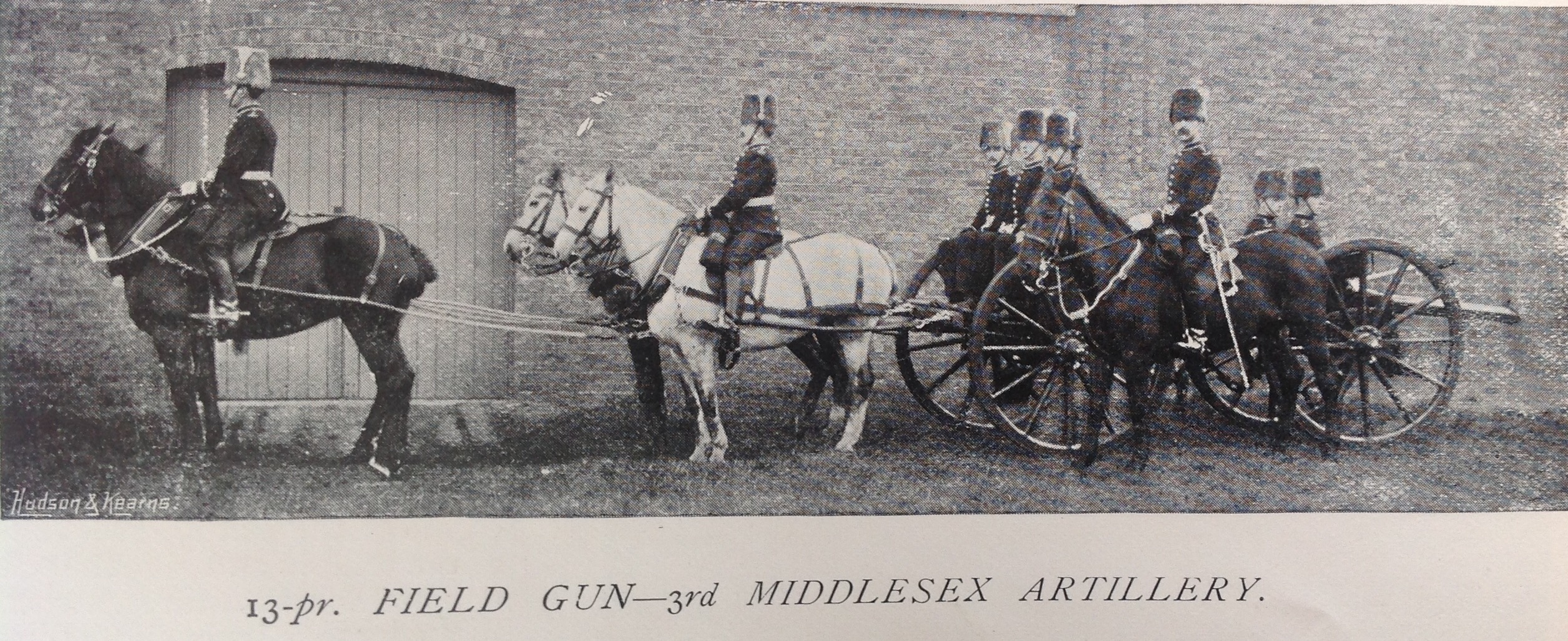
13-Pounder field gun, horse drawn by the 3rd Middlesex Artillery Volunteers, 1896

In 1888 some Volunteer batteries were reorganised as 'position artillery' (later 'heavy artillery') to work alongside the Volunteer infantry brigades. By 1893 the War Office Mobilisation Scheme had allocated the 3rd Middlesex Artillery Volunteers to the Thames defences. Although the 3rd Middlesex was not designated as Position Artillery in the Army List, in 1896 it was reported that nine of its batteries were armed with 40 Pounder RBL position guns, and a further three batteries with a mixture of 9-Pounder and 13-pounder Rifled Muzzle Loading (RML) field guns. The 3rd Middlesex won the Queen's Prize at the National Artillery Association's annual camp in 1870, 1878 and 1885, and after the competition was split into two sections it won the Position/Heavy Artillery category in 1896. The unit also had the distinction of having the Duke of York (the future King George V) as its Honorary Colonel from 30 July 1892.

On 1 June 1899 all the Volunteer artillery units became part of the Royal Garrison Artillery (RGA) and with the abolition of the RA's divisional organisation on 1 January 1902, the unit became the 3rd Middlesex RGA (Volunteers). Brigade HQ was now at 76 Lower Kennington Lane and the unit consisted of eight companies.

== Territorial Force ==
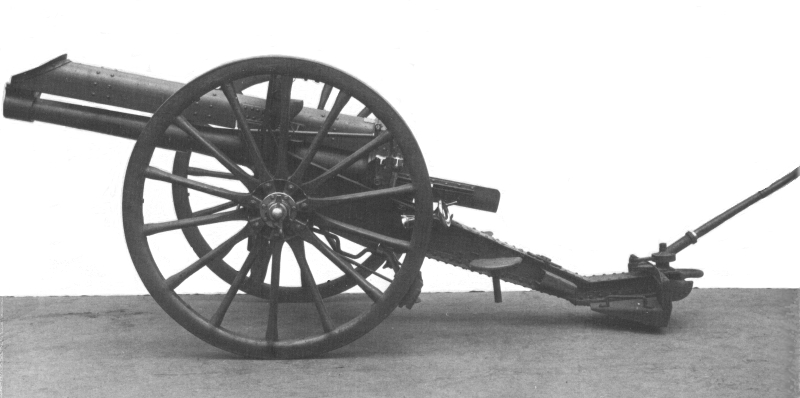
15-pounder gun issued to TF batteries.

When the Volunteers were subsumed into the new Territorial Force (TF) under the Haldane Reforms of 1908, the 3rd Middlesex transferred to the Royal Field Artillery (RFA) on 17 June as the V (or 5th) County of London Brigade, RFA, with the following organisation:

- Brigade HQ at 76 Lower Kennington Lane
- 12th County of London Battery at Kennington Lane
- 13th County of London Battery at Kennington Lane
- 14th County of London Battery at Porteus Road, Paddington
- 5th London Ammunition Column (formed 28 January 1909)

Each battery was equipped with four 15-pounder guns, and the unit formed part of the TF's 2nd London Division.

== First World War ==
=== Mobilisation ===
When war was declared on 4 August 1914 the V London Brigade had just returned from its annual training, and mobilised at Kennington Lane. The officer in command at the time was Major E.C. Massy, RA, who was a Temporary Lt-Col in the TF. After mobilisation the 2nd London Division's artillery brigades moved to the country round Hemel Hempstead, Berkhamsted and Kings Langley in Hertfordshire to begin war training.

On the outbreak of war, TF units were invited to volunteer for Overseas Service. On 15 August 1914, the WO issued instructions to separate those men who had signed up for Home Service only, and form these into reserve units. On 31 August, the formation of a reserve or 2nd Line unit was authorised for each 1st Line unit where 60 per cent or more of the men had volunteered for Overseas Service. The titles of these 2nd Line units would be the same as the original, but distinguished by a '2/' prefix. In this way duplicate batteries, brigades and divisions were created, mirroring those TF formations being sent overseas. Eventually these too were prepared for overseas service and 3rd Line reserve units were formed to produce reinforcement drafts to the others. The duplicate 2/V London Brigade was formed in September 1914 and separated in March 1915 when 1/V Brigade went overseas.

=== 1/V London Brigade ===
At the end of October 1914 the 2nd London Division was chosen to reinforce the British Expeditionary Force (BEF) fighting on the Western Front and training was stepped up, despite bad weather and equipment shortages. Brigade and Divisional training began in February 1915 and it received its orders for the move to France on 2 March. By 22 March all the batteries had reached the divisional concentration area around Béthune.

==== Aubers Ridge ====
While the division's infantry were introduced to trench routine by being attached in groups to the 1st and 2nd Divisions holding the line, the TF field batteries with their obsolescent 15-pounders were interspersed with those of the two Regular divisions equipped with modern 18-pounder guns. However, ammunition was very scarce, and the guns were restricted to three rounds per gun per day during April. Ammunition was being saved up for the Battle of Aubers Ridge on 9 May, when the 12 15-pounders of V London Bde joined with the guns of 1st and 2nd Divisions and the Royal Horse Artillery (RHA) to cut the barbed wire for the assault by 1st Division. The bombardment began at 05.00 with Shrapnel shell, then at 05.30 the guns switched to High Explosive (HE) shell to join the howitzers already firing at the German breastworks. At 05.40 the guns lifted to targets 600 yards (550 m) further back and the infantry moved to the attack, while the infantry of 2nd London Division remained in reserve. The attackers ran into devastating machine gun fire (there was no artillery barrage to suppress the defenders) and they found that the wire was inadequately cut and the breastworks barely touched. The inexperienced artillery had failed in all its tasks. A renewed bombardment was ordered from 06.15 to 07.00, but the artillery's forward observation officers (FOOs) were unable to locate the hidden German machine gun positions, which required a direct hit from an HE shell to be put out of action. The second attack failed as badly as the first, as did two others launched during the afternoon, and the survivors were pinned down in No man's land until nightfall, despite a further bombardment being laid on to allow them to withdraw.

==== Festubert ====
Although 2nd London Division suffered few casualties at Aubers Ridge, its gunners had learned a sobering lesson about the impossibility of suppressing strong defences with inadequate guns and shells. On 11 May the division was redesignated 47th (1/2nd London) Division, and on the night of 14/15 May it took its place in the line for the Battle of Festubert. The guns were already in place, with 47th Divisional Artillery operating under the control of 7th Division. Despite the continuing shortage of ammunition, the plan this time was for a long methodical bombardment. On 13 and 14 May the field guns carried out three two-hour deliberate bombardments each day, attacking the wire with slow observed fire or keeping the enemy communication trenches under fire. At night they carried out intermittent bombardments of the communication trenches and defences, to stop supplies being brought up and to prevent repairs being carried out. The guns fired about 100 rounds per day. During 15 May feint bombardments mimicking the moment of assault were carried out, but the actual attack was made after dark with some success. The fighting went on for several days, and 47th (2nd L) Division made its own first attack on the night of 25 May. The leading brigade captured the German front and support trenches, but were then pinned down by accurate German artillery fire and could advance no further. This effectively ended the battle. The heavy rate of fire during the battle was too much for the old 15-pdrs: by 26 May, 11 out of 36 guns in the division were out of action.

==== Loos ====
In June 47th (2nd L) Division took over trenches in front of Loos-en-Gohelle from the French. This was the sector selected for the next major British attack (the Battle of Loos), for which a complex artillery plan was developed. The guns supporting 47th (2nd L) Division on the southern flank of the attack were split into three groups, with Lt-Col Massy of V London Bde commanding one of these ('Massy's Group'):

- V London Bde, RFA (12th, 13th, 14th London Btys) – 12 x 15-pdrs
- 23rd Siege Bty, RGA – 4 x 6-inch 30 cwt howitzers (a New Army unit, only arrived in France on 20 August)
- G Battery, RHA – 6 x 13-pounder guns

Only in this southern part of the battlefield was there any cover for the British guns close to the line, and the short-range 15- and 13-pounders and old howitzers could be hidden behind the cottages of North and South Maroc. The artillery plan was divided into three phases:

- Phase 1: Preliminary bombardment (96 hours)
- Phase 2: The battle (48 hours)
- Phase 3: Subsequent operations, including a move of the guns (96 hours)

Two-thirds of the ammunition was allocated to Phase 1. Harassing fire began on 21 September, with the field guns limited to 150 rounds per gun per day, and consequently the wire-cutting was not good except where concentrations of field and heavy guns had been used to cut entry points. In fact, the British plan for Loos depended on a mass release of poison gas clouds – the first time that gas had been used by the BEF. It greatly aided 47th (2nd L) Division's attack on the southern flank of the attack, but was less effective elsewhere. The division had thoroughly practised its attack on dummy trenches, and at Zero hour (05.50) moved forward. Massy's Group fired continuously on the German front line and Cité St Pierre behind, supporting 142nd (6th London) Brigade on the right; the wire was well cut and having reached their objectives among the mining spoil-tips, the infantry formed a defensive flank south of Loos, which it held resolutely. However, events had not played out so well further north, at Hill 70 and the Hohenzollern Redoubt, and the battle raged on after 47th (2nd L) Division had been relieved between 28 September and 1 October. During the battle a gun of 13th London Bty had suffered a blown-out breech block, which ignited cordite cartridges in the gun-pit; Nos 1, 2 and 3 of the crew were killed and No 4 suffered burns over the whole of his body but ran to fetch the medical officer to help his comrades before he died. Later that winter, while in action near North Maroc, No 1 gun-pit of the battery suffered direct hits on two successive days, losing the whole gun crew each time.

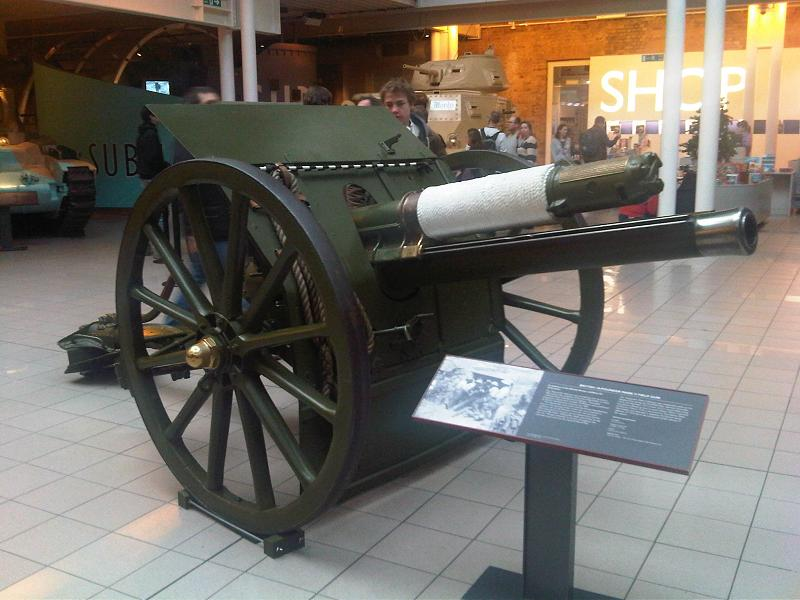
18-pounder preserved at the Imperial War Museum.

On 13 October 47th (2nd L) Division was in support for the final attack on the Hohenzollern Redoubt, and was practising on dummy trenches for a follow-up attack on Hulluch next day, but the results at the Hohenzollern were so disappointing that the operation was cancelled. The division took over the line and the artillery was in constant action over the following weeks. On 6 November 1915 the batteries of V London Bde were re-equipped with modern 18-pounders. Ammunition supply also improved, and the guns could be used for counter-battery (CB) work.

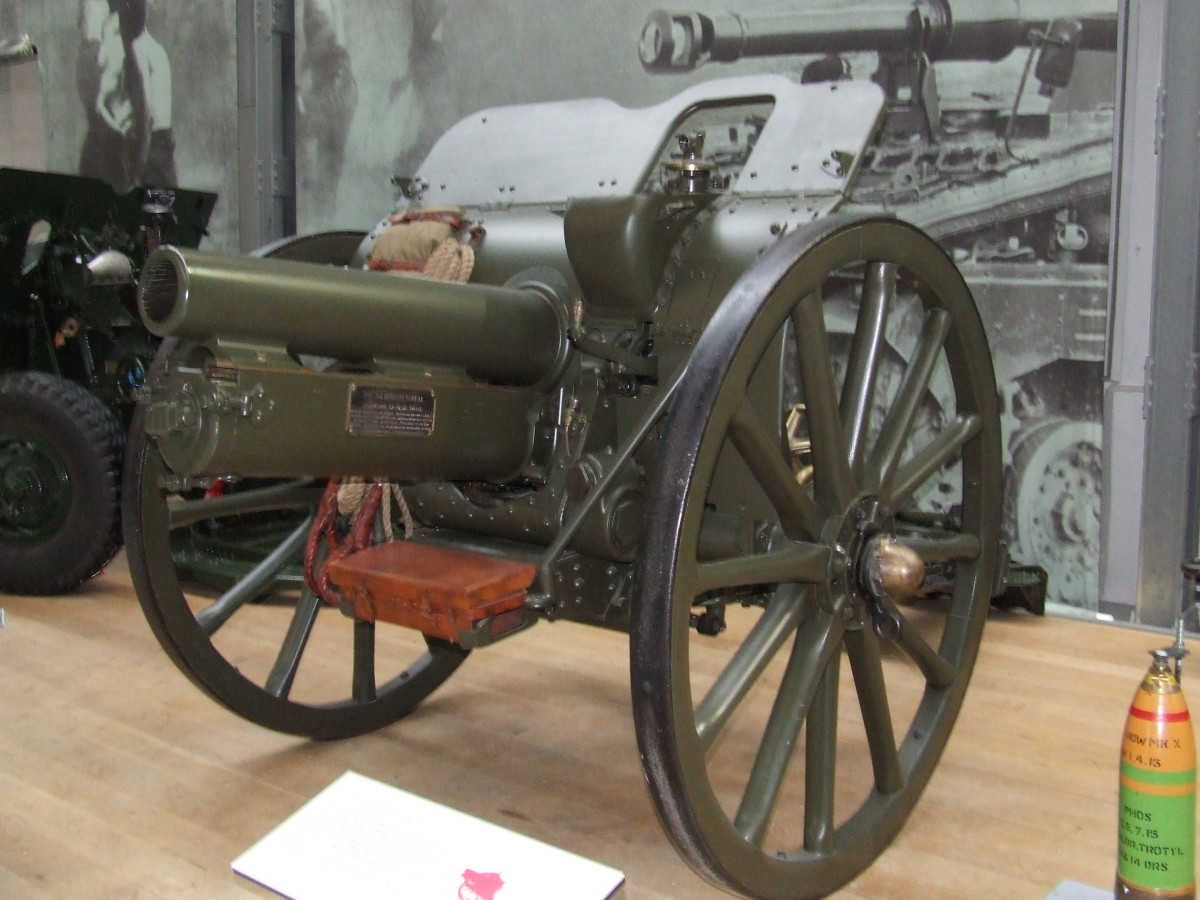
4.5-inch howitzer preserved at the Royal Artillery Museum.

==== Spring 1916 ====
On 20 April 1/V London Bde was joined by 34th Bty, a pre-war Regular unit from XXXVIII Bde in 6th Division. On 14 May 1916 the divisional artillery was redesignated, and 1/V London Bde became CCXXXV (or 235) Brigade with the batteries labelled A, B and C (VI, VII and VIII London Bdes became CCXXXVI, CCXXXVII and CCXXXVIII Bdes respectively). It also exchanged 34th Bty for B (Howitzer) Bty from CLXXVI (Leicestershire) Howitzer Brigade in 34th Division; this New Army battery had been serving with VIIII London Brigade since April. It was equipped with four 4.5-inch howitzers and became D (H)/CCXXXV Bty. At the same time the brigade ammunition columns were abolished and incorporated into the divisional ammunition column (DAC).

In the Spring of 1916 47th (2nd L) Division took over the lines facing Vimy Ridge. Active mine warfare was being conducted by both sides underground. In May the Germans secretly assembled 80 batteries in the sector and on 21 May carried out a heavy bombardment in the morning; the bombardment resumed at 15.00 and an assault was launched at 15.45, while the guns lifted onto the British guns and fired a Box barrage into Zouave Valley to seal the attacked sector off from support. 47th Divisional Artillery reported 150 heavy shells an hour landing on its poorly-covered battery positions and guns being put out of action, while its own guns tried to respond to SOS calls from the infantry under attack, though most communications were cut by the box barrage. During the night the gun pits were shelled with gas, but on 22 May the artillery duel began to swing towards the British, with fresh batteries brought in, despite their shortage of ammunition. A system of 'one round strikes' was introduced: whenever a German battery was identified every gun in range fired one round at it, which effectively suppressed them. British counter-attacks were attempted, but when the fighting died down the Germans had succeeded in capturing the British front line.

==== Somme ====
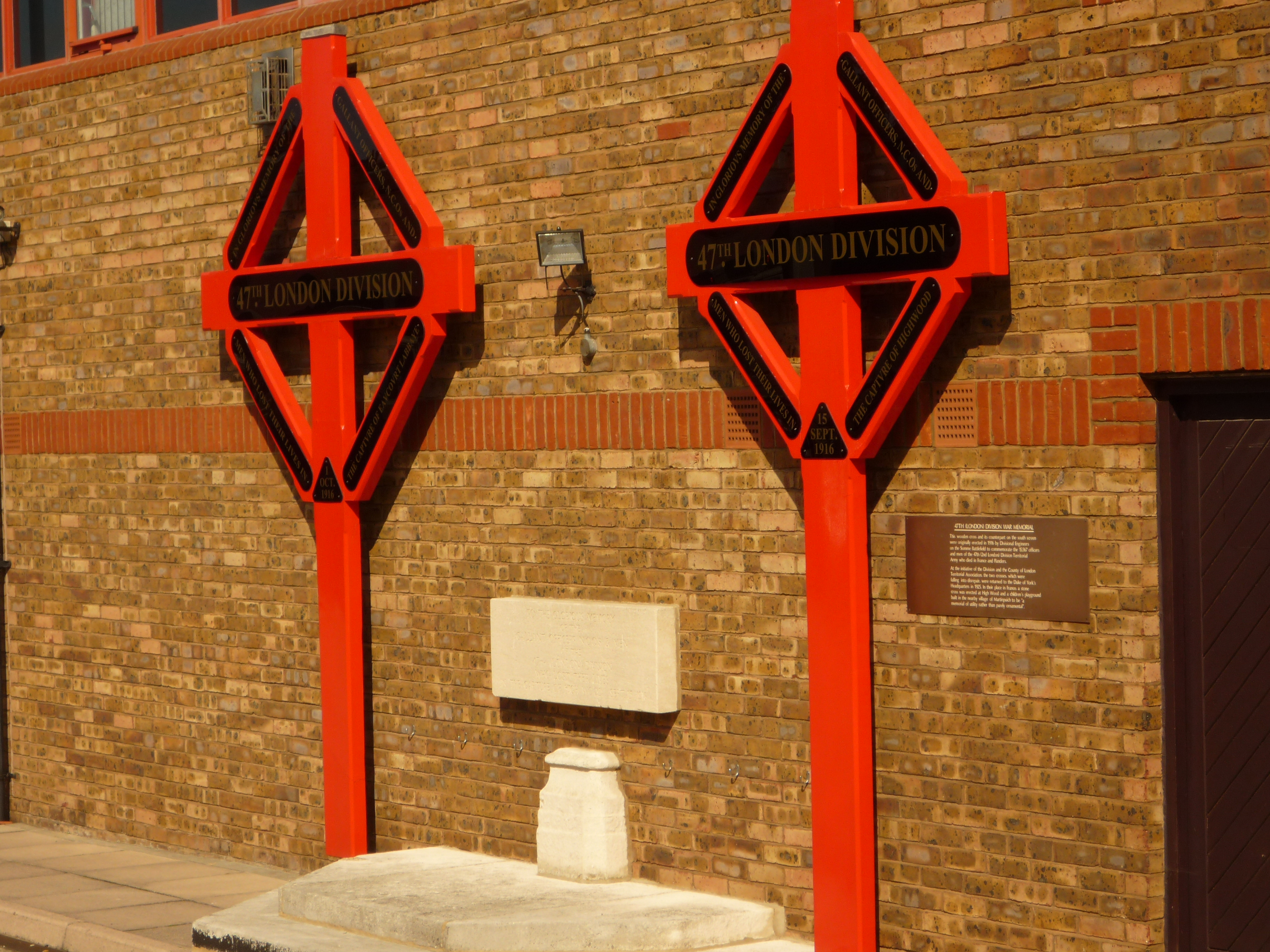
The two wooden memorial crosses originally erected at High Wood and Eaucourt l'Abbaye by 47th (2nd London) Division in 1916, now at Connaought House in Camberwell.

On 1 August 1916 47th (2nd L) Division began to move south to join in the Somme Offensive. While the infantry underwent training with the newly introduced tanks, the divisional artillery went into the line on 14 August in support of 15th (Scottish) Division. The batteries were positioned in Bottom Wood and near Mametz Wood, and became familiar with the ground over which 47th (2nd L) Division was to attack, while supporting 15th (S) Division's gradual encroachment on Martinpuich. Casualties among FOOs and signallers was heavy in this kind of fighting. Between 9 and 11 September 47th (2nd L) Division took over the front in the High Wood sector, and on 15 September the Battle of Flers-Courcelette was launched, with tank support for the first time. The barrage fired by the divisional artillery left lanes through which the tanks could advance. However, the tanks proved useless in the tangled tree stumps of High Wood, and the artillery could not bombard the German front line because No man's land was so narrow. Casualties among the attacking infantry were extremely heavy, but they succeeded in capturing High Wood and the gun batteries began to move up in support, crossing deeply-cratered ground. Here casualties among the exposed guns and gunners took their toll, but a German counter-attack was broken up by gunfire. Next day the division fought to consolidate its positions round the captured 'Cough Drop' strongpoint. When the infantry were relieved on 19 September the artillery remained in the line under 1st Division.

47th (2nd L) Division came back into the line to relieve 1st Division on 28/29 September, and began attacking Eaucourt L'Abbaye as part of the Battle of the Transloy Ridges, finally securing the ruins on 3 October. This allowed the batteries to cross the High Wood Ridge into a small valley where they remained for the rest of the Somme fighting, helping to cover the unsuccessful attacks by 47th (2nd L) Division and later 9th (Scottish) Division against the Butte de Warlencourt through October. By now the gun lines were crowded together in deep mud, guns sank up to their axles, and getting ammunition through was extremely difficult. The artillery was finally relieved on 14 October and followed the rest of the division to the Ypres Salient.

A further reorganisation of field artillery in the BEF was carried out in November 1916. In CCXXXV Bde this meant A Battery being broken up to bring B and C Btys up to a strength of six 18-pdrs each (they were then redesignated A and B Btys). A/CCXXXVII Battery, made up to six guns by half of C/CCXXXVIII Bty (originally 93rd Bty), joined as C Bty. On 19 January 1917, D (H) Bty sent one of its sections to D (H)/CCXXVI Bty, and was joined by the whole of D (H)/CCXXXVIII to make it up to six howitzers. This gave the brigade its final organisation for the rest of the war:

- A Bty – 1/13th London Bty + half 1/12th London Bty
- B Bty – 1/14th London Bty + half 1/12th London Bty
- C Bty – 1/20th London Bty + half 93rd Bty
- D (H) Bty – 1/21st London (H) Bty + half D (H)/CLXXVI (Leicestershire) Bty

==== Messines ====
At Ypres 47th (2nd L) Division garrisoned the Hill 60 sector, where mine warfare had been conducted for two years, and where the British had dug a massive deep mine beneath the hill ready for the planned Battle of Messines. The divisional artillery was arranged in two groups, one in Ypres, the other in the Railway Dugouts. These battery positions were under enemy observation and were frequently shelled during the winter. On 16 January 1917 a German attack was anticipated, and the divisional artillery, together with that of 23rd and 41st Divisions and the Corps and Army heavy guns, carried out an intense bombardment, which brought considerable enemy retaliation. As well as organised bombardments of the enemy lines, the guns frequently responded to SOS calls from the front during enemy raids, and laid on wire-cutting and box barrages for British raids.

Several weeks before the Battle of Messines (7 June) the artillery had begun destructive shoots on various points in the enemy lines and communications, and began wire-cutting in May. The enemy response was fierce: on one day 200 heavy shells fell on the position of D/CCXXXV Bty and its neighbour, scoring 12 hits on trenches, wagons and living quarters. Casualties in men and guns were frequent. 47th (2nd L) Division's role in the attack was to advance on either side of the Ypres–Comines Canal, which was practised over taped-out courses behind the lines. On 31 May bombardment of the enemy trenches became intense, and on 3 and 5 June the barrages were practised, forcing the Germans to retaliate and give away their gun positions. At 03.30 on 7 June a series of massive mines were fired under the enemy lines from Hill 60 along the Messines–Wytschaete Ridge, and the infantry began their advance. About two-thirds of the 18-pdrs fired a creeping barrage 30 yards (27 m) ahead of the infantry, while the remainder and the 4.5inch howitzers fired standing barrages 700 yards (640 m) ahead. The German defences were shattered by the mines and the bombardment, and the infantry cleared their first objectives with little difficulty. A standing barrage then protected them while they prepared for the second phase. On 47th (2nd L) Division's front there was a hold-up at Spoil Bank by the canal in the second phase, but a new barrage was laid on this point and a renewed attack made at 19.00; although this too was held up, the position was later secured by the division. The field batteries were moved up to cover the new forward positions and break up counter-attacks. During the battle some 18-pdr batteries fired as many as 6000 rounds in 24 hours.

==== Ypres ====
After Messines the division was withdrawn for training, and following a short spell back in the line at Hill 60 it was in reserve for the opening of the Third Ypres Offensive on 31 July. It held an active portion of the front under enemy observation from 18 August to 3 September, and advanced and improved the line, but the artillery found it difficult to inflict much damage on the enemy, which had adopted defence in depth with most of the troops hidden in dead ground. Between 8 and 17 September the division was in the line again, making preparations for I ANZAC Corps' attack due on 20 September and keeping up pressure by means of frequent raids. One of these raids, on 15 September, employed a hurricane bombardment to rush a troublesome enemy strongpoint near Inverness Copse. 47th (2nd L) Division was then moved south on 21 September to join First Army leaving the artillery in the line for a while longer.

The division was stationed in a quiet sector in front of Oppy and Gavrelle. The British defences were not a continuous trench line, but a series of platoon or company strongpoints, the area between each to be covered by the artillery and machine guns. Once the divisional artillery joined from Ypres, close liaison with the infantry positions was achieved, and enemy positions were regularly bombarded. Wire-cutting for raids was also carried out, and smoke and incendiary ammunition was now available.

==== Cambrai ====
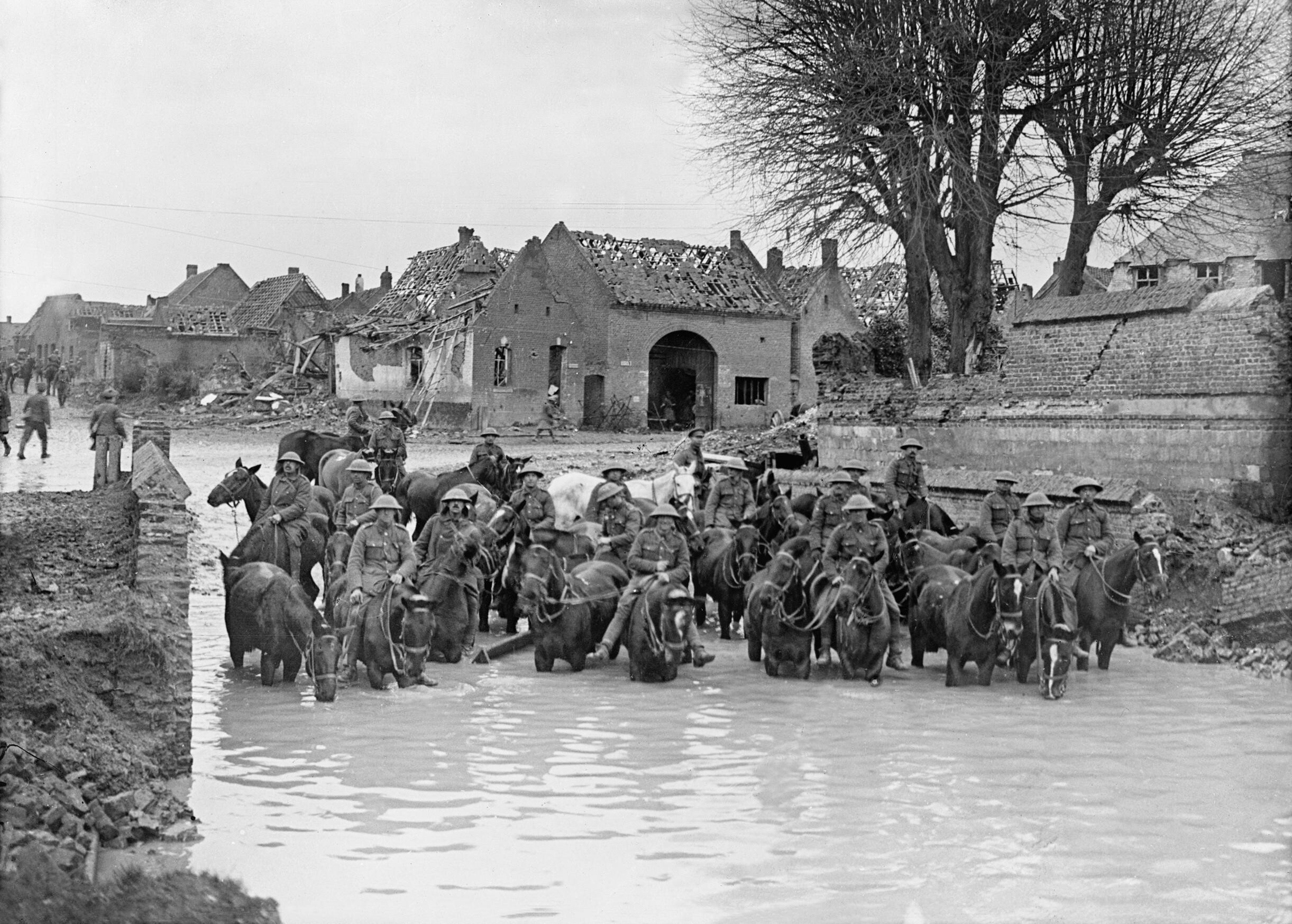
Drivers of CCXXXV Bde water their horses at Flesquières 24 November 1917 during the Battle of Cambrai.

On 19 November the division began a long march southwards, arriving on the night of 28/29 November to relieve the units holding Bourlon Wood, where fighting had been continuous since the launch of the Battle of Cambrai on 20 November. A major German counter-attack began the following morning. The infantry of 47th (2nd L) Division were covered by the artillery of the divisions they were relieving, while CCXXXV Brigade was diverted to support a counter-attack by the Guards Division. The Guards' artillery and Commander, Royal Artillery, (CRA) were absent, so the divisional commander made Lt-Col Adrian Gordon of CCXXXV Bde acting CRA, commanding both his own brigade and LXX Brigade (which happened to be moving through the area). The batteries moved up rapidly under 'open warfare' conditions and supported the Guards' successful attack on Gouzeaucourt during the afternoon. The brigade then spent the night harassing all likely enemy routes while moving the batteries up in succession to positions just below the ridge in front of Gouzeaucourt Wood. Lieutenant-Colonel Gordon also commanded the Guards' own divisional artillery as the brigades came up. 1 December was quiet, and on 2 December the CRA of Guards Division arrived; Lt-Col Gordon continued to command a group of artillery batteries from an HQ at the corner of Havrincourt Wood. Any spare time the gunners had between shoots was spent in removing stores in preparation for a withdrawal. CCXXV Brigade was relieved, and then on 11 December came back under the command of 47th (2nd L) Division in the more defensible new line that had been taken up. Lieutenant-Colonel Gordon was killed by a stray shell the following day.

==== Spring Offensive ====
While the infantry of 47th (2nd L) Division were withdrawn from the Flesquières salient to relatively comfortable winter quarters, the artillery remained in the line until 7 March 1918, when it was relieved and rejoined the division. The infantry took over the La Vacquerie sector near Cambrai from 2nd Division on the nights of 19/20 and 20/21 March. The anticipated German spring offensive (Operation Michael) began at 04.15 on 21 March (the Battle of St Quentin), before the artillery had arrived, and the division was supported by 2nd Division's artillery in the subsequent fighting. 47th (2nd L) Divisional Artillery was separated from its parent formation for the next two months.

CCXXXV Brigade had been out of the line training in mobile warfare, but A Bty was on call to send up sections at 15 minutes' notice for anti-tank duties if required. Later on 21 March the brigade was due to have relieved a brigade of 2nd Division, but at 12.00 its CO, (now Lt-Col Sydney Aschwanden, formerly of 4th County of London Bty) was ordered to take his batteries to 19th (Western) Division, then to 17th (Northern) Division, and finally to stand down. During the night orders came to join 51st (Highland) Division, but when Aschwanden and his adjutant went to reconnoitre the position they found it already in front of the British line after the fighting of 21 March. The brigade deployed behind 51st (H) Division's new position, loaned signal equipment to the Highland gunners, who had lost theirs, and provided covering fire for the division, which was being heavily attacked at Beugny. During the afternoon, with the enemy pressing forward in great numbers, the decision was made to withdraw the batteries one at a time to Haplincourt. Each battery remained in action until the last minute, covering the infantry, while coming under air attack. The withdrawal was accomplished before nightfall for the loss of one gun of B Bty, the gun team of which was shot down and the gun had to be destroyed after two failed attempts to retrieve it. The withdrawal was completed along raids clogged with transport and retreating infantry. Early on 23 March the batteries were in action again, covering the line to which 51st (H) Division had withdrawn. Late in the afternoon Aschwanden withdrew the batteries which, especially A and C, were by now in dangerously forward positions near Riencourt. All the guns were got away with very few casualties though the night.

At dawn on 24 March the battery positions and HQs came under heavy shellfire (the opening of the Battle of Bapuame). Most of CCXXXV Brigade's HQ transport horses were killed and there were numerous casualties among the men. The brigade was now operating as part of the Right Group of IV Corps' artillery, which retired at noon, covering the withdrawal of the infantry (19th (W) Division was taking over from the exhausted 51st (H) Division) and bombarding the exits from Bapaume to prevent the enemy from following up. As Right Group deployed around Ligny-Thilloy a general withdrawal was ordered, and a massive traffic jam ensued as masses of men, horses and guns attempted to fall back through Achiet-le-Petit to deploy around Bucquoy. It was not until an hour after dawn on 25 March that this blockage was cleared and CCXXXV Bde was able to deploy, still in front of Achiet-le-Petit. When the brigades time came to withdraw it came under heavy shellfire in Achiet-le-Petit, suffering many casualties, but it got through to Bucquoy and came into action just north of Puisieux. When Aschwanden finally made contact with 19th (W) Division, he was informed of a German breakthrough further south, and was ordered back to Foncquevillers. Here, for the first time since 21 March, the guns came out of action, the horses could be unharnessed, and the men bivouacked.

On 25 March the Germans made five attacks on Hébuterne, all of which were driven back, with the guns doing tremendous damage and the line held. But rumours of further breakthroughs were everywhere, and a panic took hold amongst the transport lines, including 47th DAC. Seven German aircraft also attacked the brigade, to which the gunners replied with rifle and Lewis gun fire; the only casualties were two horses killed. During the night of 25/26 March 19th (W) Division was relieved by 4th Australian Brigade, who adopted an aggressive defence covered by an ad hoc artillery group comprising CCXXXV and CIV Brigades (later LXXXXIII Bde replaced CIV Bde, and Aschwanden assumed command of the group). A regular defence scheme was established, with OPs and signals set up, and the situation stabilised. The guns occupied old gun-pits dug for the Battle of the Somme in 1916.

The last phase of the Operation Michael, the Battle of the Ancre, began on 5 April. Most of its weight fell upon 47th (2nd L) Division further south, but it extended as far north as Hébuterne. However, here it was disrupted by a spoiling attack launched at 05.30 that morning by 37th Division with 4th Australian Bde supported by CCXXXV Bde. During the day the brigade suffered five hours of heavy shellfire, with numerous casualties at brigade HQ and among the horse lines. The fighting petered out that day. On 10 April LXXXXIII was relieved by CCXXXVI Bde, meaning that both of 47th (2nd L) Division' s field brigades were serving together, albeit under other command. Finally, the brigade was relieved on 6 May and went back to rest near Abbeville.

==== Hundred Days ====
47th (2nd London) Division was rejoined by its artillery at the end of May and moved up into corps reserve in late June. On 28 June the artillery moved up to support an attack launched by the Australian Corps (the Battle of Hamel). The dawn attack was made with overwhelming artillery support, notable because to preserve secrecy the guns had not been able to register their barrage lines beforehand.

The Allied Hundred Days Offensive began on 8 August 1918, and the artillery of 47th (2nd L) Division were once again detached, supporting 18th (Eastern) Division from 13 August to 4 September. On 22 August 18th (E) Division formed a defensive flank while 47th (2nd L) Division attacked from in front of Amiens towards high ground beyond Happy Valley (the Battle of Albert). From now on the battle was constantly moving, and the British divisions began sending forward all-arms brigade groups including artillery batteries to clear strongholds and round up prisoners as they advanced. The field artillery frequently had to organise creeping barrages for these small operations, and casualties from enemy shellfire and gas were continuous. CCXXXV Brigade needed a great deal of skill to get its guns across the River Ancre after Albert was captured.

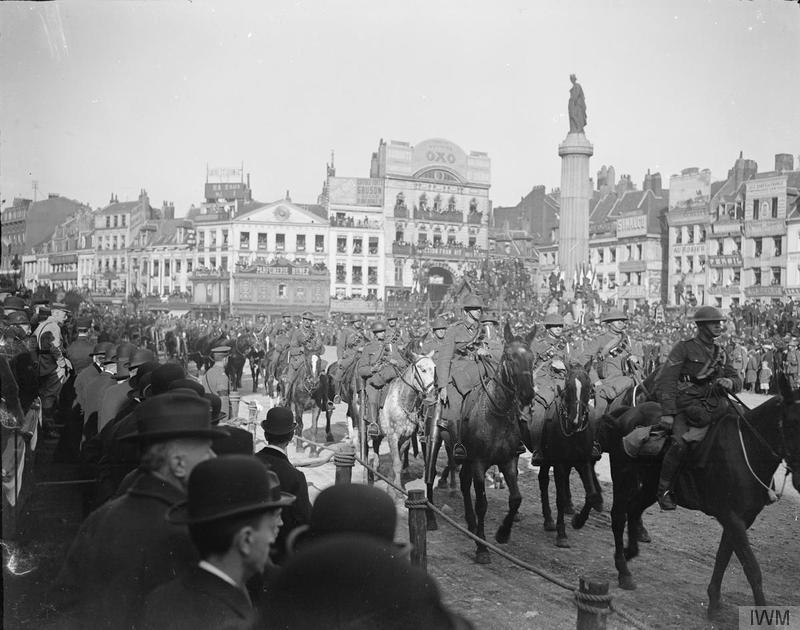
Artillery of 47th (2nd London) Division in the Grande Place during the official entry into Lille, 28 October 1918/

Both 18th (E) and 47th (2nd L) Divisions, their infantry now very weak, were relieved in early September. 47th Divisional Artillery then moved by train (only the second time they had done this) to rejoin the rest of the division, which had been moved to the Lille front. The division was scheduled to be transferred to the Italian Front, but the orders wee changed and the division was put into the line to follow the retreating enemy across Aubers Ridge as far as the main Lille defences. After a 10-day pause, the division was relieved and once again prepared for the move to Italy. However, on 28 October this as finally changed, and 47th (2nd L) Division made the Official Entry into the liberated city of Lille on 28 October. It afterwards moved up to the River Scheldt, occupying Tournai when the enemy retired. It advanced beyond, but when the Armistice with Germany came into force on 11 November, 47th Division marched back to Tournai.

Immediately after the Armistice 47th (2nd L) Division was engaged in railway repairs. It went into winter quarters mining villages in the Béthune area to await demobilisation, which began in January 1919. By the end of March units had been reduced to cadre strength, and these returned to England in May. The artillery brigades were demobilised at Shoreham-by-Sea in June 1919.

==== Commanding officers ====
The following commanded 1/V London/CCXXV Brigade during the First World War:

- Lt-Col E.C. Massy, CB, CMG, DSO, from mobilisation to March 1917
- Lt-Col A.C. Gordon, DSO, March–April 1917
- Lt-Col W.B. Grandage, killed in action May 1917
- Lt-Col A.C. Gordon, DSO, killed in action December 1917
- Lt-Col S.W. L. Aschwanden, DSO, to demobilisation

=== 2/V London Brigade ===
The 2/2nd London Division came into existence quickly as volunteers rushed to join up. There were no guns or horses for the artillery, but the batteries improvised dummy guns mounted on hardcarts, with wooden sights and washing-lines for drag-ropes. Although the Master-General of the Ordnance, Major-General Sir Stanley von Donop, was pleased with their work and promised them the first guns available, it was not until February 1915 that some old 15-pdrs arrived for training. In March 1915 the division took the place of 1/2nd London Division in the St Albans area. At the end of May, now numbered 60th (2/2nd London) Division, it moved into Essex, with the artillery at Much Hadham. Finally, at the end of November it began to receive new 18-pdr guns and towards the end of January 1916 the division moved to the Warminster training area on Salisbury Plain.

On 28 April 3/1 Wessex Bty arrived as a fourth 18-pdr battery for 2/V London Brigade. Then, as with the TF artillery brigades in the BEF, those in 60th Division were numbered on 17 May, 2/V Londons taking the number CCC (or 300) Brigade, and the batteries were lettered. 3/1 Wessex Bty was exchanged for 2/21 London (H) Bty from 2/VIII London (CCCIII) Brigade, which became D (H) Bty. The Brigade Ammunition Columns were also absorbed into the DAC.

On 14 June 1916 orders arrived for 60th Division to move to the Western Front, and the artillery units made the crossing from Southampton to Le Havre between 22 and 26 June. The division concentrated in the area behind Arras by 29 June. It relieved 51st (Highland) Division in the line on 14 June, with the artillery moving into position over the next three nights. The line held was facing the same strong German positions along Vimy Ridge that 47th (2nd L) Division had faced, and there was constant mine warfare and Trench raiding. The artillery was mostly engaged in suppressing troublesome German trench mortars (Minenwerfers) by firing short concentrated bombardments on specific sectors of the enemy line. Some trench raids were preceded by local wirecutting bombardments, or by a barrage, others were 'stealth' raids.

However, on 30 August the divisional artillery underwent the same reorganisation into six-gun batteries that was going on throughout the BEF. In 60th (2/2nd L) Division this meant that CCC Bde was broken up: A and half of B Bty joined CCCII Bde; C and half of B Bty joined CCCIII Bde, and D (H) Bty joined CCCI Bde. The gunners of the original 2/12th, 2/13th and 2/14th London Batteries continued to serve with their new units with 60th Division in Salonika and Palestine for the remainder of the war.

== Interwar ==
The TF was reconstituted on 7 February 1920 and 5th London Bde, RFA, was reformed under the command of Lt-Col Aschwanden at Kennington Lane, though its batteries were now 9th–12th, taking the numbers of batteries that had disappeared from 3rd and 4th London Bdes in the reorganisation. The Paddington battery left (becoming 17th London Bty in the 7th London Bde) and two batteries from Woolwich (originally in the 2nd London Bde) joined. In 1921 the TF was reorganised as the Territorial Army (TA), and its designations were changed: the unit now became 92nd (5th London) Brigade, RFA, with the following organisation:

- 365 (9th London) Battery at Kennington Lane
- 366 (10th London) Battery at Kennington Lane
- 367 (11th London) Battery at 10 Beresford Street, Woolwich
- 368 (12th London) Battery (Howitzer) at 10 Beresford Street

When the RFA was subsumed into the Royal Artillery on 1 June 1924, its unit were redesignated as 'Field Brigades, RA', and when the RA adopted the term 'regiment' instead of the obsolete 'brigade' for a lieutenant-colonel's command, the unit became 92nd (5th London) Field Regiment, RA, on 1 November 1938.

In the reformed TA, 92nd (5th London) Fd Bde was part of 56th (1st London) Division. However, in 1935 most of 47th (2nd London) Division was converted into 1st Anti-Aircraft Division and the remaining London units were organised into a single London Division. Surplus units such as 92nd (5th London) Fd Bde remained as 'Army Troops' in London District.

After the Munich Crisis the TA was rapidly doubled in size. On 1 May 1939, 92nd (5th London) Field Regiment created a duplicate 140th Field Regiment, RA, at Clapham Common by separating 366 (10th London) and 367 (11th London) Btys (it was officially given the '5th London' subtitle in 1942). Field regiments were now organised as Regimental HQ (RHQ) and two batteries each of 12 guns. These were 18-pounders of First World War pattern, though now equipped with pneumatic tyres and towed by motorised gun tractors. There was a programme to replace the 18-pdr barrels with that of the new 25-pounder coming into service, giving the hybrid 18/25-pounder. 92nd and 140th Fd Rgts were both unattached units in London District.

== Second World War ==
=== 92nd (5th London) Field Regiment ===
==== Arras and Dunkirk ====
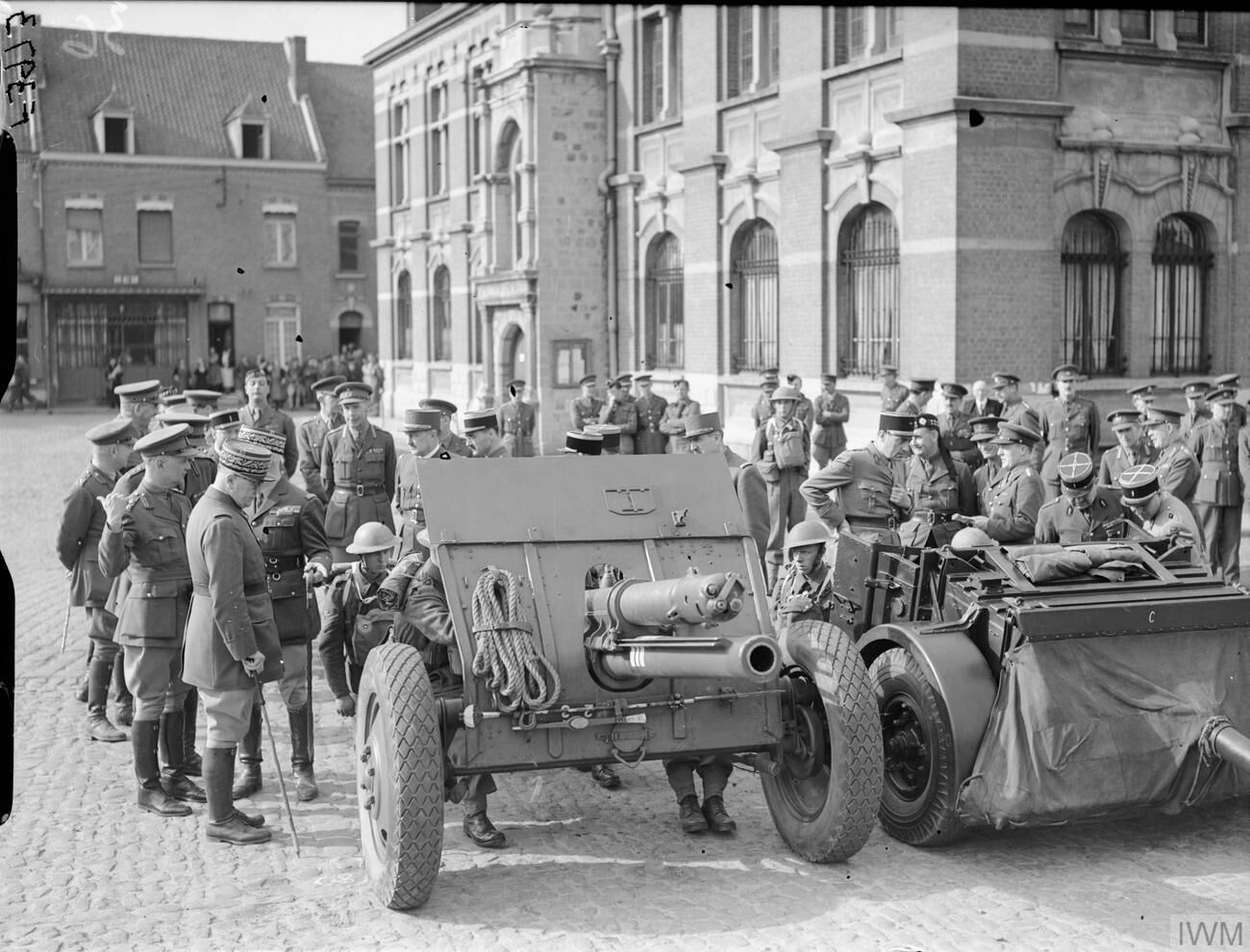
18-Pounder gun being inspected in France, April 1940.

92nd (5th London) Field Rgt took over the 18-pdr guns of 1st Regiment Royal Horse Artillery (which was upgrading to 18/25-pdrs) and moved to France in November. On 28 December 1939 it joined 5th Division, which was being assembled in the new British Expeditionary Force (BEF) in France. For the remainder of the war it served in this formation, alongside 91st (4th London) Fd Rgt from Lewisham. The two regiments were deployed around Auchy-les-Mines; 92nd (5th London) Fd Rgt later moved to Armentières, grouped with the division's 13th Bde. During the Norwegian Campaign 5th Division was pulled out of the line and warned for a transfer to Norway, so that when the Battle of France began on 10 May, the division was in reserve, with 92nd (5th London) Fd Rgt detached at Lihus since 29 April.

The BEF started its advance north into Belgium to defend the line of the Dyle in accordance with 'Plan D', and 5th Division reached as far as Brussels. But the German Army broke through the Ardennes to the east, forcing the BEF to withdraw again to the line of the Escaut.

The guns of the reserve divisions, 5th and 50th (Northumbrian), assembled in the rear, and on the night of 19 May 92nd Fd Rgt fired 2000 rounds. By 20 May the German breakthrough had cut the BEF off from the French armies. On that day 5th and 50th Divisions together with 1st Tank Brigade formed 'Frankforce' (under Maj-Gen H.E. Franklyn of 5th Division) to hold the south-facing salient around Arras. Next day, Frankforce counter-attacked against the German Panzers moving west past Arras. Two columns were formed, each with a tank battalion, a battalion of the Durham Light Infantry from 50th Division, and some anti-tank guns. Each column was accompanied by a battery of 92nd (5th London) Fd Rgt: 365 Bty with the Right Column and 368 Bty with the Left. The armoured thrust made some progress, but ran into strong opposition and was bombed by the Luftwaffe. There was no artillery fireplan, and 92nd Fd Rgt's guns were not called upon to fire until late in the day. The attacking columns withdrew at nightfall and at 04.00 on 22 May 92nd Fd Rgt was withdrawn to positions round Givenchy. The regiment blamed a French withdrawal and lack of air support for the failure of the operation, but it is now recognised that the Arras counter-attack seriously delayed the German advance.

On 22 May the Germans prepared to cross the River Scarpe from the west. 5th Divisional artillery was concentrated and did 'much execution' to the attackers but by late afternoon on 23 May the enemy were across in strength, despite having their bridges destroyed several times by the gunners. At last light, Frankforce was ordered to hold out to the last round, but the situation in Arras was now hopeless and the BEF's commander, Lord Gort changed the orders at midnight, directing Frankforce to move north out of the salient as quickly as possible. The gunners began a 'nightmare' withdrawal down the only road, which was being used by two divisions. Nevertheless, most of the garrison got away to new defensive positions on the canal between Béthune and La Bassée.

On 26 May, Frankforce was rushed further north to plug a gap in the line left by the retreating Belgian army. 5th Division only arrived at the last minute, with the positions they were to occupy south of Ypres already under German shellfire. On that day Gort made the decision to evacuate the BEF from Dunkirk (Operation Dynamo). The guns of 5th Division were in action under heavy fire during the Battle of the Ypres–Comines Canal, first at Ploegsteert, then on the Yser, until 29 May. Most of the division then withdrew to the inner perimeter and embarked for England, but guns were required to stay behind to bolster 50th Division's defences for a further 24 hours, and it was not until early on 1 June that the last of 5th Division's gunners destroyed their remaining equipment and were evacuated.

==== Home Defence ====
While reforming after Dunkirk, 5th Division was posted to Scottish Command, with 92nd Fd Rgt assembling at Fintray in Aberdeenshire. On 29 October 1940 the division moved down to Lancashire to join III Corps in Western Command, where it stayed (except for a month in Northern Ireland in April 1941) until 1942. The field regiments were re-equipped with whatever guns were available until sufficient 25-pounders were ready. It was only in October 1940 that the RA was producing enough battery staffs to begin the process of changing regiments from a two-battery to a three-battery organisation. (Three 8-gun batteries were easier to handle, and it meant that each infantry battalion in a brigade could be closely associated with its own battery.) 92nd Field Rgt formed 467 Bty on 17 January 1941 while it was stationed at Rochdale.

==== India and Persia ====
In January 1942 5th Division passed under direct War Office control preparatory to embarking for India in March. While part of the division was diverted for the invasion of Vichy French-controlled Madagascar, 92nd Fd Rgt and the rest of the division arrived in Bombay on 21 May. After concentrating, the division moved across India to Ranchi (the base area for the Burma Campaign). However, after less than three months in India, 5th Division was diverted again, this time to Persia, which was threatened by the German advance on the Caucasus. The division embarked for Basra and proceeded by road via Baghdad into Persia, where it spent the winter near Teheran. The threat to Persia having been diverted by the Battle of Stalingrad, 5th Division was next earmarked as an assault division for the Allied invasion of Sicily (Operation Husky). It proceeded via Baghdad and Damascus where it trained for amphibious landings and mountain warfare. It moved to the Suez Canal zone of Egypt in June, and embarked on 5 July.

==== Sicily ====
The division landed in Sicily on 10 July 1943, and together with 50th Division advanced up the east coast to the plain of Catania, where they ran into stiffer opposition. On 13 July a Commando and paratroop attack (Operation Fustian) seized Primosole Bridge over the Simeto river and prevented its demolition, but was unable to retain possession of the bridge. 50th Division was tasked with seizing a bridgehead and 92nd Fd Rgt was among the six regiments of field guns gathered to support the attack. Three battalions of the Durham Light Infantry attacked at 01.00 on 17 July after the massed guns had fired concentrations for half an hour before zero, and the guns continued with barrages and some concentrations once the fighting began. The whole fire programme was restricted by the availability of only a single observation post (OP) that could see the fighting going on in the undergrowth on the far bank of the Simeto. A limited bridgehead was achieved, but it proved impossible to push through it until Catania and Mt Etna were outflanked by other formations.

5th Division remained under fire from the foothills until Eighth Army's flanking forces caused a German withdrawal that saw the division 'chasing his troops round the slopes of Mount Etna'. At this stage, 5th Division was withdrawn from the fighting to prepare for the invasion of mainland Italy (Operation Baytown).

==== Italy ====
5th Division landed at Reggio di Calabria on 3 September 1943, covered by artillery fire from the opposite side of the Straits of Messina, and then advanced up the coast road to meet US Fifth Army. There was little opposition apart from demolitions and rearguard actions. Fifth Army then advanced up Italy, with 5th Division in the Apennines where the gunners' training in mountain warfare paid off. The division's advance was halted at Rionero when the Allies were held up at Monte Cassino and a succession of defended river lines.

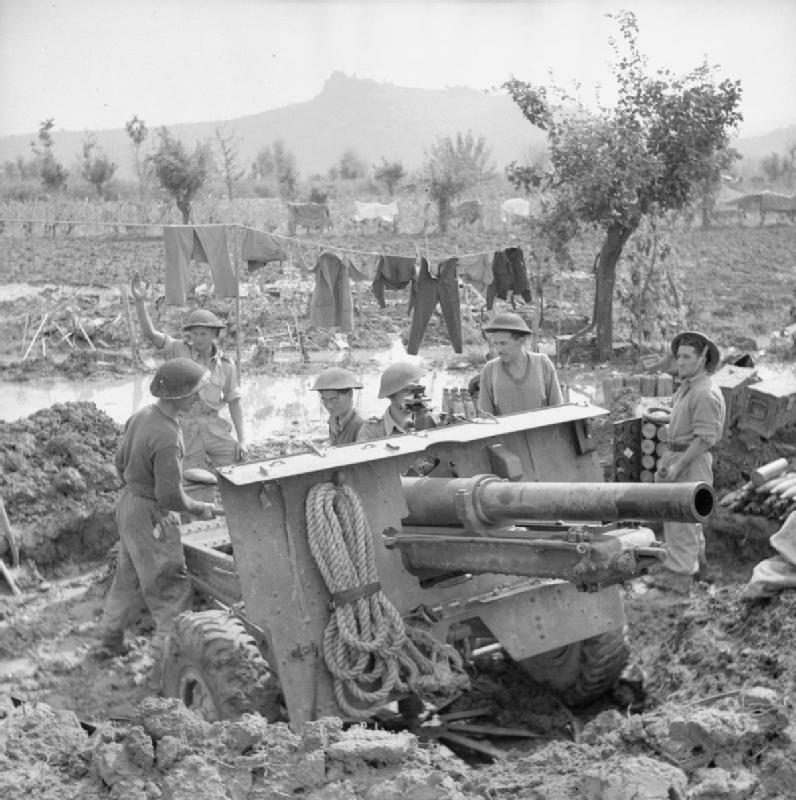
25-pounder and crew in Italy

During this winter stalemate, 5th Division was transferred to the east coast to assist the Canadians at Ortona and New Zealanders at Orsogna. These attacks were only moderately successful, so 5th Division was switched again, back to the west coast to cross the mouth of the Garigliano and outflank Cassino. The division's 'silent' assault crossing (without artillery fire) on the night of 17/18 January 1944 using beach landing techniques was successful in establishing a firm bridgehead that was held against enemy counter-attacks with the support of the guns, but without further troops it was impossible to advance further. The field regiments had to occupy positions in full view of enemy OPs and suffered a number of casualties.

In March the division was sent to Anzio to relieve another division, and held a section of the line in a trench warfare stalemate that matched the First World War, with the same kind of defensive fire tasks, counter-battery fire and barrages for local attacks or counter-attacks. The war became mobile again after the capture of Cassino in May 1944, and 5th Division followed the retreating Germans as far as the Tiber before it was withdrawn for rest.

==== North West Europe ====
5th Division handed over its guns and equipment to the newly arrived 46th Division and embarked for Egypt. After a period of rest and reorganisation, followed by internal security duty in Palestine from July 1944 to February 1945, 5th Division was chosen for Operation Goldflake whereby troops from the Mediterranean theatre were transferred to reinforce 21st Army Group fighting in the final stages of the campaign in North West Europe. The division began to arrive at Taranto in Italy in mid-February and then re-embarked at Naples to be shipped to Marseilles on 8 March. It was concentrated near Ghent by 19 March.

The division had not re-equipped in time for the Crossing of the Rhine, but took part in a number of actions in the pursuit to the Elbe. During the assault crossing of that river on 29 April, 92nd Fd Rgt and the rest of the divisional artillery fired in support of 15th (Scottish) Division – the last set-piece bombardment of the war – and then 5th Division passed through the bridgehead they had secured. By now there was only scattered resistance and thousands of prisoners were collected. Hostilities ended on VE Day.

92nd (5th London) Field Regiment served for a while in the occupation forces in Germany (British Army of the Rhine) until RHQ and the three Btys were placed in suspended animation on 16 March 1946

=== 140th (5th London) Field Regiment ===
140th Field Regiment mobilised at Woolwich under the command of Lt-Col T.F.K. Howard and moved to France via Le Havre on 6 March 1940. In the BEF it served as Army Troops in I Corps. The policy was to 'superimpose' army field regiments onto divisional artillery to give enhanced firepower as required. During the fighting on the Escaut 140th Fd Rgt was in action with 42nd (East Lancashire) Infantry Division at Wannehain, where it suffered a number of casualties and had three guns knocked out by enemy shellfire. During the retreat to Dunkirk the regiment found itself at Cassel as part of 'Somer Force' commanded by Brigadier the Hon Nigel Fitzroy Somerset, consisting of 2nd Battalion Gloucestershire Regiment, 4th Battalion Oxfordshire and Buckinghamshire Light Infantry, the armoured cars of the East Riding Yeomanry, and various support units. Its role was to hold the line from Cassel to Hazebrouck in the outer perimeter of the Dunkirk pocket. By 27 May Cassel was surrounded and there was heavy fighting around the hilltop town, with 140th Fd Rgt's 18-pdrs 'doing great execution'. On 29 May the enemy closed in with tanks: five of these were knocked out before the remainder forced their way into the town, and German infantry attacked troop command posts until they were driven out by the gunners. The regiment adopted a position of all-round defence. Finally a military policemen on a motorcycle got through the surrounding enemy to deliver a day-old order for Somer Force to withdraw. Lieutenant-Colonel Howard ordered his men to hold out till nightfall and then destroy all equipment and make their escape. The regiment destroyed its guns and set off in the dark. More than half were killed or captured, but 14 officers and 287 men (out of 580) made their way back to Dunkirk and caught some of the last boats to leave the beaches.

The regiment slowly reformed in England as and when equipment became available. In December, still as an 'Army Field Regiment', it was in Southern Command awaiting the arrival of its Signal Section. On 25 January 1941, while the regiment was at Bournemouth, its third battery was formed; at first the three batteries were designated P, Q and R, but reverted to 366, 367 and 504. By March it had been assigned to V Corps as part of the field army. In May 366 Fd Bty was attached to the War Office Reserve, and on 4 June it left for service in Iceland; it was replaced on 4 September when 514 Fd Bty formed at Bradford Down Camp, Dorchester, Dorset, and joined the regiment, which now had its signal section. On 17 February 1942 the regiment's '5th London' subtitle was authorised, and by April it had its attached Light Aid Detachment of the Royal Electrical and Mechanical Engineers.

V Corps was assigned to the Allied landings in North Africa (Operation Torch) under First Army, and 140th Fd Rgt came directly under First Army when that was formed in the summer. The landings began on 8 November, and the force built up thereafter. 140th Field Regiment served in this campaign, which ended with the capture of Tunis in May 1943.

The regiment was not used in the Allied invasion of Sicily. On 23 September 1943 it was converted to the medium artillery role as 140th (5th London) Medium Regiment with 367 and 518 Med Btys, while 504 Bty converted to the heavy role and joined 75th (Highland) Heavy Rgt. The regiment immediately joined Eighth Army fighting in the Italian Campaign. It served in 2nd Army Group Royal Artillery at the crossing of the Garigliano in January 1944 as part of the Battle of Monte Cassino, and in May it supported II Polish Corps in the final assaults on Monte Cassino.

By the end of 1944 Eighth Army was suffering a severe manpower shortage, and the only way to keep infantry and field artillery units up to strength was to redeploy men from surplus anti-aircraft and medium artillery units. 140th (5th London) Field Regiment was placed in suspended animation on 1 February 1945.

== Postwar ==
When the TA was reconstituted on 1 January 1947 the regiment reformed at Kennington as 292 (5th London) Airborne Anti-Tank Regiment, RA, in the TA's 16th Airborne Division. (140th Field Regiment was formally disbanded at the same time.) On 1 March 1951 the regiment reverted to the field artillery role as 292 (5th London) Airborne Field Regiment, changing its designation on 15 July 1955 to 292 (5th London) Parachute Field Regiment.

On 31 October 1956 the regiment was amalgamated with 285 (Essex) Parachute Field Rgt to form 289 Parachute Light Regiment Royal Horse Artillery, which was reduced to a single battery in the Territorial and Army Volunteer Reserve (TAVR) in 1967. Since 1999 it has existed as 289 Commando Troop, Royal Artillery.

== Uniforms ==
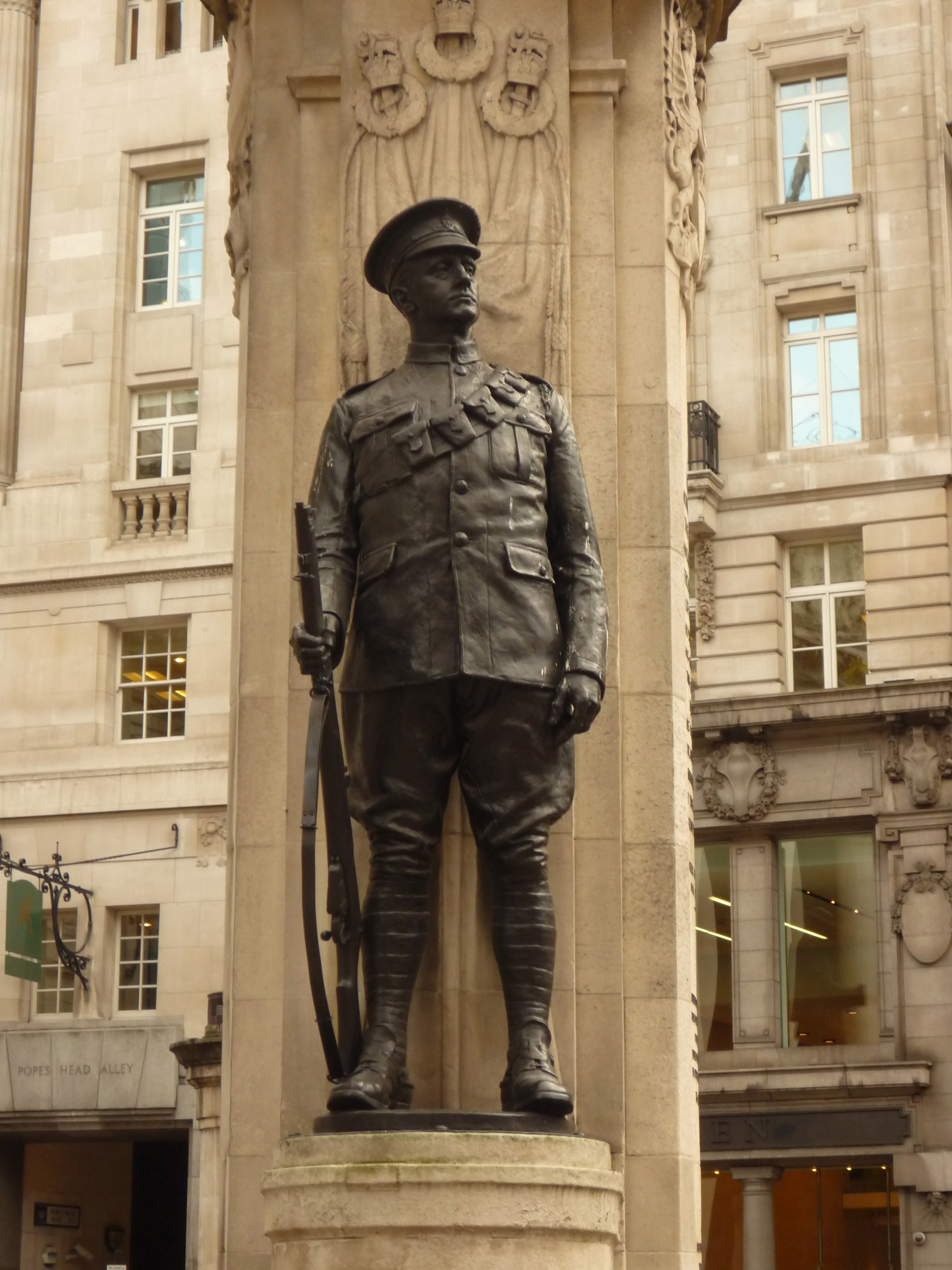
The artillery figure on the London Troops Memorial.

The 3rd Middlesex AVC wore a Royal Artillery-style uniform of blue tunic with red facings and white piping, blue trousers with broad red stripe, and white belts. The headdress was a brown Busby, which was unusual in that the fur was from Raccoons, and the officers' busbies were made from the ringed tail fur, giving a striped appearance and leading to the nickname 'Truro's Tigers'. The unit kept this distinctive headdress even when other AVCs changed to the standard blue cloth Home Service helmet. The busby plume was white for other ranks, white-over-red for officers and red for the brass band; the drum and fife band wore the busby with cap lines like the Royal Horse Artillery. The buttons and waistbelt clasps bore the shield of Middlesex (three Seaxes in pale) over the RA gun. In undress uniform a pillbox cap was worn with the RA 'grenade' badge. When the Brodick cap and later the peaked service cap were introduced in the early 1900s the unit adopted its own version of the RA 'gun' badge: where the scroll above the gun carried the motto 'UBIQUE' for the RA or 'VOLUNTEERS' for the RGA (V), the unit's badge carried 'THIRD', while the scroll beneath the gun, which usually carried the second motto 'QUO FAS ET GLORIA DUCUNT', carried 'MIDDLESEX R.G.A. VOLUNTEERS'. The shoulder title was '3' over 'MA' but was in metal rather than the usual embroidery.

== Honorary colonels ==
The following served as Honorary Colonel of the unit:

- Duke of York (later King George V), appointed 30 July 1892
- Sir Harry Waechter, 1st Baronet, CMG, 2nd Lieutenant 20th Battalion, London Regiment (Blackheath and Woolwich), appointed 29 October 1914
- Brig-Gen E.C. Massy, CB, CMG, DSO, former CO, appointed 10 January 1931
- Col S.W.L. Ashwanden, DSO, TD, former CO, appointed 10 January 1935
- Earl Mountbatten of Burma, appointed 25 July 1947

== Memorials ==
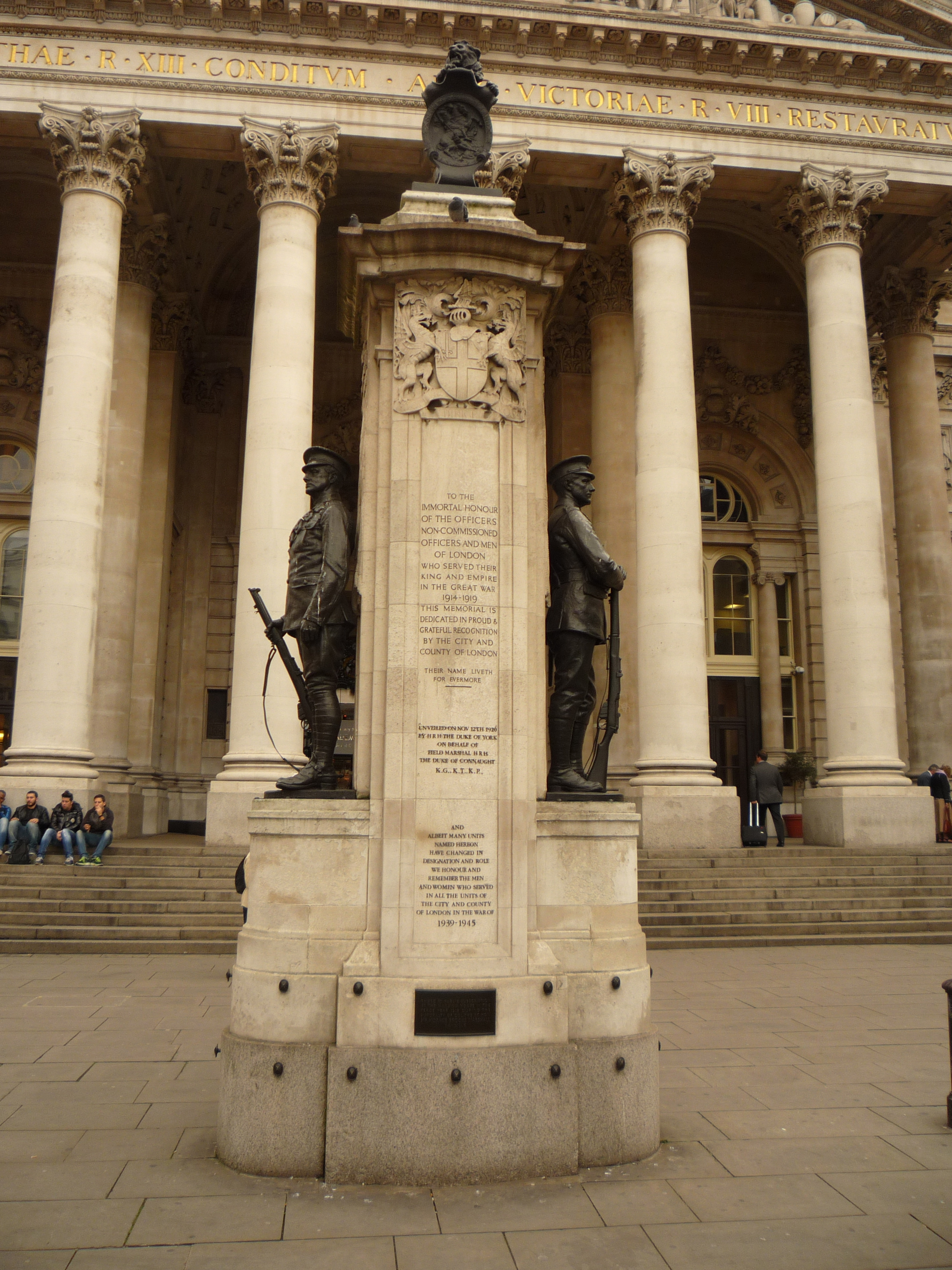
London Troops Memorial in 2013

5th County of London Brigade, RFA, is listed on the City and County of London Troops Memorial in front of the Royal Exchange, with architectural design by Sir Aston Webb and sculpture by Alfred Drury. The left-hand (northern) figure flanking this memorial depicts a Royal Artilleryman representative of the various London Artillery units. Each unit listed also had a brass plaque depicting the memorial: the 5th London Brigade's is at the Army Reserve Centre at 312 London Rd Romford, having been moved from the former TA Centre at East Ham in 2003.

Two wooden memorial crosses erected at High Wood and Eaucourt l'Abbaye by 47th (2nd London) Division in 1916 were replaced in stone in 1925. The restored wooden crosses were preserved at the Duke of York's Headquarters in Chelsea (the former divisional HQ), and are now at Connaught House, the HQ of the London Irish Rifles in Camberwell.

== External sources ==
- British Army units from 1945 on
- British Military History
- Imperial War Museum, War Memorials Register
- The Long, Long Trail
- Patriot Files orders of battle
- Land Forces of Britain, the Empire and Commonwealth – Regiments.org (archive site)
- The Regimental Warpath 1914–1918
- The Royal Artillery 1939–45
- Stepping Forward: A Tribute to the Volunteer Military Reservists and Supporting Auxiliaries of Greater London
- Graham Watson, The Territorial Army 1947
