= 289 Commando Troop, Royal Artillery =

Reserve commando artillery troop of the British Army

289 Commando Troop Royal Artillery
- Active: 31 October 1956-date
- Country: United Kingdom
- Branch: British Army
- Type: Artillery
- Role: Close Support Guns
- Size: Regiment then Battery then Troop
- Part of: 104 Regiment Royal Artillery
- peacetime HQ: Plymouth
- Tactical Recognition Flash
- Equipment: 4.2" Mortar; 25 pounder L118 light gun

The 289 Commando Troop originated as a parachute artillery regiment of the Territorial Army. Formed in London in 1956, it was transferred to the Royal Horse Artillery in 1960 and reduced to a battery in 1967. In 1977 it was re-roled as a Commando battery before being reduced to a troop in 1999. It is now based in Plymouth as a detached part of 266 (Gloucestershire Volunteer Artillery) Battery, where it performs the same close support light gun role as part of 104 Regiment Royal Artillery, whilst also supporting 29 Commando Regiment in an unofficial role.

== History ==
=== Regiment ===
The post-Second World War Territorial Army included a single airborne division 16th Airborne Division. The division was disbanded in 1956 with the remaining units forming the 44th Independent Parachute Group (TA). On 31 October 1956, 289 Parachute Light Regiment, Royal Artillery (TA) was formed by the amalgamation of the 285th (Essex) Parachute Field Regiment RA and 292nd (5th London) Parachute Field Regiment. (Note: 285th (Essex) Parachute Field Regiment was formerly the 2nd East Anglian Brigade, RFA of the East Anglian Division in World War I and 85th (East Anglian) Field Regiment, RA in World War II. 292nd (5th London) Parachute Field Regiment was formerly the 5th London Brigade, RFA of the 2nd London Division in World War I and 92nd (5th London) Field Regiment, RA in World War II.) Both regiments had served with the 16th Airborne Division before amalgamation. The new regiment's number was the median of 285 and 292. The regiment consisted of:

Headquarters at East Ham
P Battery at Stratford
Q Battery at Blackheath
R Battery at Plumstead
S Battery at Grays

Each battery was equipped with six 4.2" Mortars and supported one of the four parachute infantry battalions of 44th Independent Parachute Group. The regiment's armament was later augmented with 25 pounders.

On 10 September 1960, the regiment was transferred to the Royal Horse Artillery as 289 Parachute Regiment, Royal Horse Artillery (TA). It was amalgamated with 880th Locating Battery (Note: 880th Forward Observation Battery, RA (TA) was formerly assigned to 16th Airborne Division.) without change of title on 1 May 1961 and was redesignated as 289 Parachute Light Regiment, Royal Horse Artillery (TA) on 18 March 1963.

=== Battery ===
The 1966 Defence White Paper announced a complete reorganisation of the Territorial Army as the Territorial and Army Volunteer Reserve (TAVR) and the former regimental and divisional structure was ended. As a result, the regiment was reduced to an independent battery in TAVR II (which had a NATO role, specifically support for the British Army of the Rhine) in London and adopted the title 289 Parachute Battery, Royal Horse Artillery (Volunteers) on 1 April 1967. It was the only independent battery in TAVR II and continued to be assigned to 44th Parachute Brigade (Volunteers).

The battery left the 44th Parachute Brigade shortly before it was disbanded and on 1 April 1977 it was reroled and redesignated as 289 Commando Battery, Royal Artillery (Volunteers). Now it was to provide support to the Plymouth based 29th Commando Regiment Royal Artillery, equipped with L118 light guns.

=== Troop ===
On 30 June 1999, the battery was disbanded; a troop-sized sub-unit, 289 Parachute Troop, Royal Artillery (Volunteers), joined the Bristol based 266th (Gloucestershire Volunteer Artillery) Battery, Royal Artillery (Volunteers) in 100th (Yeomanry) Regiment Royal Artillery and provided support to 29th Commando Regiment, still equipped with L118 Light Guns.

In 2007, 289 Parachute Troop, by now located at Romford, was transferred to 201 Battery (Hertfordshire and Bedfordshire Yeomanry) Royal Artillery (still in 100th (Yeomanry) Regiment). 201st Battery was now made up of two troops (Luton and Romford) and Battery Headquarters in Luton. The battery provided support to the Colchester based 7th Parachute Regiment Royal Horse Artillery, including deployments to Iraq.

Under Army 2020 plans, 201st Battery was placed in suspended animation. Luton elements formed part of 678th (The Rifles) Squadron, 6th Regiment, Army Air Corps in April 2014. 289 Parachute Troop was placed in suspended animation on 31 March 2014 but was subsequently transferred to Plymouth where they performed the UAV DH3 role until being re-equipped with 105mm Light Guns in 2017.

== Honorary Colonels ==
The regiment's Honorary Colonel was Louis Mountbatten, 1st Earl Mountbatten of Burma from formation in 1956, through to 1967. He had been Honorary Colonel of the predecessor 292nd (5th London) Parachute Field Regiment, Royal Artillery. The position seems to have been vacant from 1967 until 1970 when Brigadier W. F. K. "Sheriff" Thompson was appointed on 2 January 1970. Thompson held this position until his tenure expired and he was succeeded on 13 November 1978 by Lt-Gen Sir Terence D.H. McMeekin. He was succeeded on 13 November 1983 by Maj-Gen Arthur G.E. Stewart-Cox.

== See also ==
- 16th Airborne Division
- 44th Parachute Brigade (V)

== Bibliography ==
- Frederick, J.B.M. (1984). Lineage Book of British Land Forces 1660–1978. Wakefield, Yorkshire: Microform Academic Publishers. ISBN 1-85117-009-X.
