= Perrott baronets =

Set index for Perrott baronets

Two baronetcies have been granted for the surname Perrott, one in the Baronetage of Great Britain and the other in the Baronetage of the United Kingdom.

- Perrott baronets of Plumstead (1st creation, 1716)
- Perrott baronets of Plumstead (2nd creation, 1911): see Sir Herbert Charles Perrott, 1st Baronet (1849–1922)
