= Sir Herbert Perrott, 5th Baronet =

British Baronet

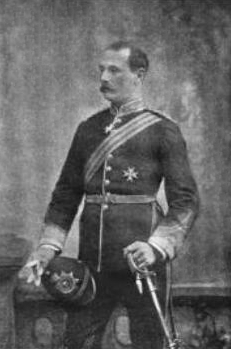
- In The Sketch, 11 December 1901
- Born: 26 October 1849
- Died: 15 February 1922 (aged 72); South Kensington, London, England
- Occupation: Military officer
- Spouse: Ethel Lucy Hare (m. 1901)
- Children: 2

Sir Herbert Charles Perrott, 5th and 1st Baronet, CH, CB (26 October 1849 – 15 February 1922) was an English baronet who succeeded to a 1716 baronetcy in 1886 and was created a baronet in his own right on 21 June 1911, with precedence to his heirs male from the 1716 creation. Since there were no sons, the baronetcies became extinct with his death in 1922.

== Background ==
Perrott was elder son of Sir Edward George Lambert Perrott, 4th Baronet (died 1886) by his wife Emma Maria Houghton (died 1878), only daughter of Charles Evelyn Houghton, commander R.N., descended in the female line, from John Evelyn.

== Career ==
Perrott was Chief Secretary of the St. John Ambulance Association from its formation in 1877 and secretary-general of the Most Venerable Order of the Hospital of St. John of Jerusalem in England from 1910. He was made Companion of the Order of the Bath (CB) in the October 1902 South African Honours list, for home service to the war effort during the Second Boer War. After the First World War, he was appointed a Member of the Order of the Companions of Honour (CH) in the 1918 Birthday Honours.

He died from influenza and bronchial pneumonia at his home in Queen's Gate on 15 February 1922.

== Family ==
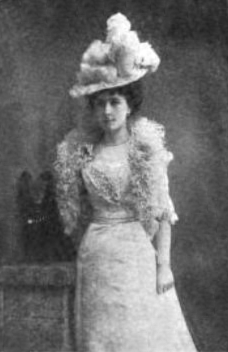
Ethel Lucy Hare in 1901

He married on 10 December 1901 at St Peter's Eaton Square, London, Ethel Lucy Hare (1875–1939), eldest daughter of the late Captain Marcus Augustus Stanley Hare, R.N., of Court Grange, Newton Abbott. Lady Perrott was appointed a Lady of Grace of the Order of the Hospital of Saint John of Jerusalem in England (DStJ) on 8 May 1902. In 1928, this was enlarged to Dame Grand Cross of the order.

They had issue, two daughters:

1. Marie Louise Priscilla Perrott, later Baroness Forester (20 December 1909 – 1988), wife as of 1931 of the 7th Baron Forester since 1931. They had issue one son and four daughters, of whom the two eldest daughters Christine Helene and Juliet Mary married the 7th Baron Bolton and the 8th Marquess of Downshire respectively. Lady Forester had a royal godparent in H.H. Princess Marie Louise of Schleswig-Holstein.
2. Helena Ruth Perrott, later Viscountess Maitland (1912 – 1 September 1999, aged 87), died as Helena, Viscountess Maitland; she married 1936 Ivor Colin, Viscount Maitland, (29 August 1915 – 18 January 1943), killed in action in North Africa, aged 27, only son and heir of Ian Maitland, 15th Earl of Lauderdale and had issue three daughters, of whom the eldest Mary Helena married the 4th Baron Biddulph.

== Baronetcy second creation ==
The 1911 second creation was likely designed to overcome formal failures. The first creation of 1716 had been for James of Robert Perrott, styled 1st Bart., of Richmond, Surrey (died 1759). It was claimed that there was limitation to his brother and the heirs male of his body, in reward for diplomatic services, but no patent was registered in the College of Arms. George Edward Cokayne's Complete Baronetage gave a detailed account of procedural failings, with a warrant rather letters patent.

Baronetage of Great Britain
Preceded by Edward Perrott	Baronet (of Plumstead); 1886–1922	Extinct
Baronetage of the United Kingdom
New creation	Baronet (of Plumstead); 1911–1922	Extinct
Preceded by Ward baronets	Perrott baronets of Plumstead; 21 June 1911	Succeeded by Stoker baronets
