= Dutry baronets =

Extinct baronetcy in the Baronetage of England

Escutcheon of the Dutry baronets

The Dutry baronetcy, of the City of London, was a title in the Baronetage of Great Britain. It was created on 19 June 1716 for Dennis Dutry, a wealthy London merchant and director of the Honourable East India Company. He was childless and the title became extinct on his death in 1728.

He had married Mary, daughter of the Bordeaux merchant and Huguenot exile Hil(l)ary Renau or Reneu, and died on a visit to Bordeaux. She married secondly, in 1734, Gerrard Vanneck or Van Neck, also of the East India Company, and died in 1750.

== Dutry baronets, of the City of London (1716) ==
- Sir Dennis Dutry, 1st Baronet (died 1728)

Baronetage of Great Britain
Preceded by Dixwell baronets	Dutry baronets of the City of London; 19 June 1716	Succeeded by Perrott baronets
