= 1st Essex Artillery Volunteers =

1st Essex Artillery Volunteers 2nd East Anglian Brigade, RFA 85th (East Anglian) Field Regiment 285 (Essex) Airborne Light Regiment
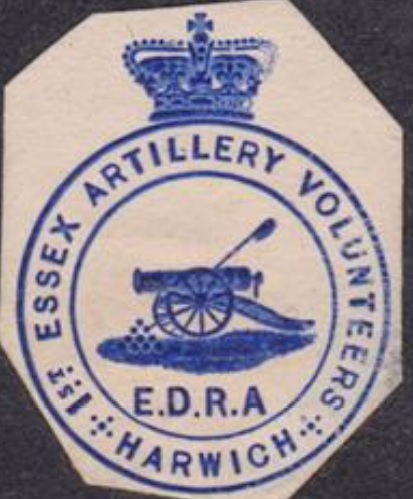
- Crest of the 1st Essex Artillery Volunteers, c1890
- Active: 18 February 1860– 31 October 1956
- Country: United Kingdom
- Branch: Volunteer Force/Territorial Army
- Role: Garrison Artillery; Field Artillery; Mountain Artillery; Medium Artillery; Airborne Artillery
- Part of: 54th (East Anglian) Division
- Garrison/HQ: Artillery House, Stratford Green
- Engagements: Sinai and Palestine Campaign; Italian Campaign; Burma Campaign

Commanders
- Notable commanders: Sir William Makins, 1st Baronet, MP, VD

The 1st Essex Artillery Volunteers was a unit of Britain's part-time auxiliary forces raised in Essex in 1860 in response to an invasion scare. It served under various designations as field artillery in Palestine during World War I. During World War II its units served as mountain artillery in Italy and as jungle artillery and medium artillery in Burma. Postwar it became an airborne unit until it was merged with other units in the 1950s.

== Volunteer Force ==
The enthusiasm for the Volunteer movement following an invasion scare in 1859 saw the creation of many units composed of part-time soldiers eager to supplement the Regular British Army in time of need. It is not clear what happened to the 1st Essex Artillery Volunteer Corps (AVC), which was apparently formed in November 1859 but was short-lived. The 2nd Essex AVC was formed at Harwich and its first officers were commissioned by the Lord Lieutenant of Essex on 18 February 1860; it was renumbered as the 1st Essex AVC in September. Similarly, the original 3rd Essex at Barking was renumbered 2nd; its officers were commissioned on 13 September and it moved to Grays in November. A new 3rd Essex AVC was formed at Plaistow on 26 June 1861, later moving to Stratford. No administrative brigade was formed for the Essex AVCs, which were attached to various other units for administration:

- 1st (Harwich) Essex AVC – from October 1863 to the 1st Norfolk AVC, part of the 1st Administrative Brigade, Norfolk Artillery Volunteers, from November 1864
- 2nd (Grays) Essex AVC – to 14th (Woolwich Dockyard) Kent AVC from 13 November 1863; 14th Kent AVC disbanded and 2nd Essex attached to 3rd Essex AVC from June 1870
- 3rd (Stratford) Essex AVC – initially to 5th Essex (Plaistow and Victoria Docks) Rifle Volunteer Corps; from March 1863 to 10th (Royal Arsenal) Kent AVC at Woolwich; later independent with its own Lieutenant-Colonel (William Makins) and Honorary Colonel appointed in 1869
- Cadet Corps – formed and affiliated to 1st Essex AVC December 1876

A major reorganisation of the Volunteer Force in 1880 saw the 1st Norfolk Admin Brigade consolidated into a single unit, with the 1st Essex AVC due to become No 5 Battery at Harwich. Meanwhile the 2nd and 3rd Essex, with one-and-a-half batteries and eight batteries respectively, merged to form a new 1st Essex. However, the Harwich volunteers were unhappy with the arrangements and asked to be transferred to the new 1st Essex AVC, which thus had the following organisation:

- Headquarters (HQ) at Artillery House, Stratford Green
- No 1 Battery at Harwich
- No 2 Battery at Grays, with an additional half battery
- Nos 3–10 Batteries at Stratford
- Cadet Corps at Harwich, disbanded 1884

The unit was attached to the Eastern Division of the Royal Artillery (RA) from 1 April 1882, and from September 1886 its official title was 2nd Volunteer (Essex) Brigade, Eastern Division, RA; it reverted to '1st Essex Artillery Volunteers' in 1889. It was increased to 12 batteries in April 1886.

As well as manning fixed coast defence artillery, some of the early Artillery Volunteers manned semi-mobile 'position batteries' of smooth-bore field guns pulled by agricultural horses. But the War Office refused to pay for the upkeep of field guns for Volunteers and they had largely died out in the 1870s. In 1888–91 the 'position artillery' concept was revived and some Volunteer batteries were reorganised as position batteries to work alongside the Volunteer infantry brigades, the others becoming garrison companies. On 14 July 1892 the 1st Essex Volunteer Artillery was reorganised as one position battery and 11 companies:

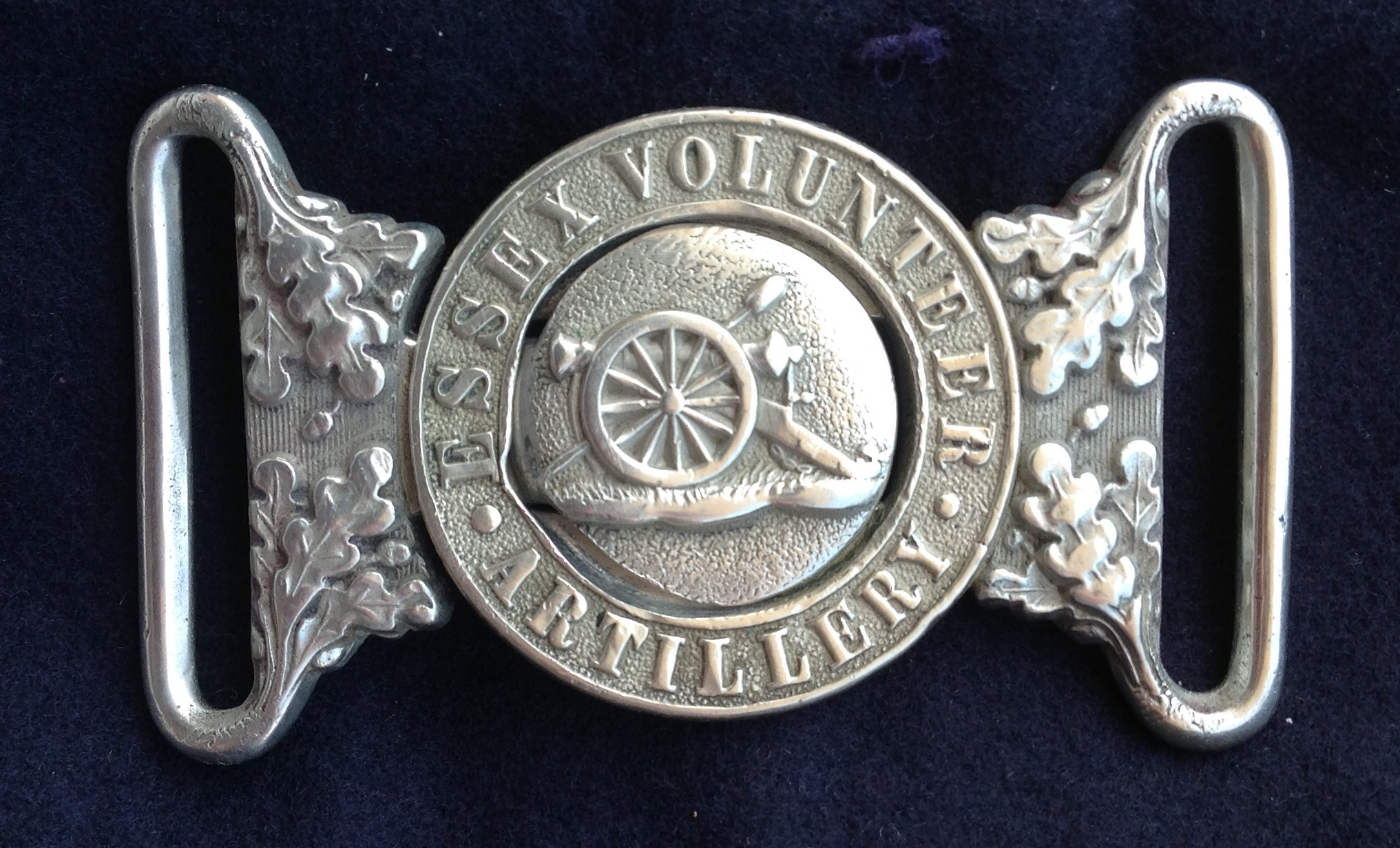
Waistbelt clasp of the Essex Volunteer Artillery, ca 1891.

- HQ at Stratford (by now part of the County Borough of West Ham)
- No 1 Battery at Stratford
- No 2 Company and a half company at Harwich
- No 3 Company at Sherfield Road, Grays, Orsett and Purfleet
- Nos 4–7 and 10–11 Companies at Stratford
- No 8 Company at Laurie Square, Romford
- No 9 Company at High Street, Hornchurch, and Dagenham
- No 12 Company at Southend-on-Sea

By April 1899 there were two companies at Harwich, and they left to combine with four newly-raised companies in Suffolk to form a new 1st Suffolk and Harwich Volunteer Artillery grouped around the ports of Harwich, Ipswich and Felixstowe. This left the rest of the 1st Essex concentrated in the London suburbs and along the Thames Estuary. On 1 June 1899 all the Volunteer artillery units became part of the Royal Garrison Artillery (RGA) and with the abolition of the RA's divisional organisation on 1 January 1902 the unit became the 1st Essex RGA (Volunteers).

When the City Imperial Volunteers were raised to serve in the Second Boer War, some 240 members of the 1st Essex VA volunteered, of whom 14 non-commissioned officers (NCOs) and gunners were selected. One sergeant died while on service.

In 1907 the Member of Parliament for Epping, Lt-Col Amelius Lockwood, asked a Parliamentary question implicitly criticising the small number of 15-pounder breechloading guns assigned to the one heavy battery and eight companies of the Essex RGA (V), all of which were allocated to mobile guns.

== Territorial Force ==
When the Volunteers were subsumed into the new Territorial Force (TF) under the Haldane Reforms of 1908, the Essex RGA (V) was split up. While one battery at Stratford remained with the RGA as the East Anglian (Essex) Heavy Battery, the bulk of the unit was assigned to the Royal Field Artillery (RFA) as the II (or 2nd) East Anglian Brigade, with the following organisation:

- HQ – Artillery House, Stratford Green
- 1st Essex Battery – Artillery House, Stratford Green
- 2nd Essex Battery – 17 Victoria Road, Romford
- 3rd Essex Battery – Artillery Drill Hall, Brook Road, Grays
- 2nd East Anglian Ammunition Column – Artillery House, Stratford Green

The three batteries were each equipped with four modernised BLC 15-pounder guns. The unit was assigned to the East Anglian Division of the TF.

== World War I ==
=== Mobilisation ===
The East Anglian Division began its annual training on 27 July 1914, with the divisional artillery travelling to Redesdale Training Area in Northumberland. When the order to mobilise was given on 4 August, the units had to return to their headquarters by train and then move to their war stations. By 10 August the division had concentrated around Brentwood, Essex, and on 20 August it moved to Chelmsford and formed part of the coast defences of the UK until the following May.

On the outbreak of war, units of the Territorial Force were invited to volunteer for Overseas Service. On 15 August 1914, the War Office issued instructions to separate those men who had signed up for Home Service only, and form these into reserve units. On 31 August, the formation of a reserve or 2nd Line unit was authorised for each 1st Line unit where 60 per cent or more of the men had volunteered for Overseas Service. The titles of these 2nd Line units would be the same as the original, but distinguished by a '2/' prefix. In this way duplicate battalions, brigades and divisions were created, mirroring those TF formations being sent overseas.

=== 1/II East Anglian Brigade ===
The 1st East Anglian Division was employed on coast defence until May 1915, when it was concentrated at St Albans preparatory to going overseas as the 54th (1st East Anglian) Division. However, when the infantry departed for the Gallipoli Campaign, the divisional artillery was left behind. In August it joined the 2nd East Anglian Division at Thetford and Brandon, Suffolk, rearmed with modern 18-pounder guns and handed over its obsolete 15-pounders to the 2nd Line batteries.

On 17 November 1915 the 54th Divisional Artillery embarked for France, where it joined 33rd Division, a 'Kitchener's Army' division whose artillery were still under training. After a month on the Western Front, during which parties of officers and men had been attached for training to other divisions in the Front Line, 54th Divisional Artillery was warned that it was to be transferred to Egypt to rejoin its parent division, which had been withdrawn from Gallipoli. Embarkation began at Marseille on 30 January 1916 and disembarkation was completed at Alexandria by 14 February. The divisional artillery rejoined 54th (EA) Division at Mena Camp near Cairo and in April moved into No 1 (Southern) Section of the Suez Canal defences, where it began training for desert warfare.

On 26 May 1916 1/II East Anglian Brigade was renumbered CCLXXI (271) Brigade, RFA, and its batteries became A, B and C. On 20 December it was reorganised into two six-gun batteries, with C Battery split up between A and B, and was joined by A Bty from 272 (H) Bde (the old 1/1st Suffolk Bty in 1/III East Anglian Howitzer Bde), which became C (H)/271 Bty equipped with four 4.5-inch howitzers and with its share of 272's Brigade Ammunition Column.

CCLXXI Brigade then took part in the Sinai and Palestine Campaign, including the First (26–7 March), Second (17–9 April) and Third Battles of Gaza (27 October–7 November) and the final capture of Gaza (1–7 November). At the end of the year the division was engaged in the Battle of Jaffa (21–22 December). 54th (EA) Division was next engaged in the action at Berukin (9–10 April 1918). Finally it took part in the opening stage of Allenby's final offensive (the Battle of Megiddo), known as the Battle of Sharon (19–23 September).

The division was then taken out of the line and concentrated at Haifa, where it was engaged in repairing communications for the rapidly advancing army. It next moved to Beirut, where it was concentrating when the Armistice of Mudros was signed with Turkey and hostilities ended on 31 October.

In late November 1918 the division was ordered to return to Egypt, the artillery proceeding by sea and arriving in mid-December. Demobilisation began in January 1919, and the TF units were slowly reduced to cadres. In March and April, when its guns had been handed in and about one-third of its men had left, 54th Divisional Artillery was converted into an ad hoc cavalry regiment to act as mounted police during disturbances in Cairo. Demobilisation recommenced in May and was completed in June.

=== 2/II East Anglian Brigade ===
The volunteers pouring into the depots manned the 2nd Line TF units. Training for the 2nd Line artillery was hindered by the shortage of equipment, and several months passed before guns, horses and harness were received. Even then, only obsolete French De Bange 90 mm cannon were available for training. Early in 1915 the 2nd East Anglian Division (which was numbered 69th in August 1915) concentrated round Thetford, where it formed part of First Army in Central Force. The divisional artillery was distributed around Brandon, Cambridge and Tuddenham. In November the divisional artillery took over the 15-pounder guns released by its 1st Line (see above).

The division's role throughout the war was to train drafts of reinforcements for units serving overseas. In May 1916, 2/II East Anglian Brigade was numbered CCCXLVI (346) Bde, the batteries became A, B and C, and it was joined by 2/2nd Suffolk (Howitzer) Bty from 2/III East Anglian Brigade, which became D (H) Bty. The following month the division was transferred to Northern Command and moved to Harrogate in North Yorkshire.

On 10 November 1916, B Bty was broken up to bring A and C Btys up to six-gun strength, and the following month CCCXLV (2/I East Anglian) Bde was broken up, with C (2/3rd Norfolk) Bty becoming B Bty in CCCXLVI Bde. On 22 December a group of new six-gun 18-pdr batteries were formed at Harrogate in 69th (2nd EA) Division's billeting area, and on 30 December two of these, 384 and 385, were attached to CCCXLVI Bde, affiliated to A and B Bty respectively. This gave the brigade the following organisation:

- A Bty – former 2/1st Essex + half 2/2nd Essex
  - 384 Bty
- B Bty – former 2/3rd Norfolk + half 2/2nd Norfolk
  - 385 Bty
- C Bty – former 2/3rd Essex + half 2/2nd Essex
- D (H) Bty – former 2/2nd Suffolk (H)

After training alongside CCCXLVI Bde, 384 and 385 Batteries joined CLXVI Bde and went with it in September 1917 to join 14th Indian Division in Mesopotamia.

At the beginning of May 1917 69th (2nd EA) Division moved to Nottinghamshire, remaining in Northern Command, with the artillery at Welbeck Camp. The following winter it went into winter quarters in Doncaster. By now many of the original infantry units had left the division, which lost its territorial designation, becoming simply 69th Division. It never went overseas, spending the whole war providing reinforcement drafts for units serving overseas. Demobilisation began after the Armistice with Germany, and the divisional artillery had virtually disappeared by 27 January 1919.

=== 3/II East Anglian Brigade ===
A 3rd Line Depot brigade (3/II East Anglian Brigade) was formed early in March 1915. At first, training had to be carried out without any guns, harness or horses. In May the unit was affiliated to No 4 TF Artillery School at High Wycombe, which took over training while 3/II became a holding and draft-finding unit. The 3rd Line East Anglian brigades were merged into the school in August 1916, when it became 4th Reserve Brigade, RFA (TF).

== Interwar ==
=== 85th (East Anglian) Field Brigade ===
When the TF was reformed on 7 February 1920 the unit was reformed in 54th (East Anglian) Division as 2nd East Anglian Brigade, RFA, with a new 4th Essex Bty at Colchester. On the reconstitution of the TF as the Territorial Army in 1921 it was numbered as 85th (East Anglian) Brigade, RFA, with the following organisation:

- RHQ at Artillery House, Stratford Green
- 337 (Essex) Field Bty at Artillery House, Stratford Green
- 338 (Essex) Field Bty at Hornchurch Road, Romford
- 339 (Essex) Field Bty at 17 Sir Isaac's Walk, Colchester
- 340 (Essex) Field Bty (Howitzers) at 40 Brook Road, Grays
- 1st Cadet Battery

The establishment of a TA divisional artillery brigade was four 6-gun batteries, three equipped with 18-pounders and one with 4.5-inch howitzers, all of World War I patterns. However, the batteries only held four guns in peacetime. The guns and their first-line ammunition wagons were still horsedrawn and the battery staffs were mounted. Partial mechanisation was carried out from 1927, but the guns retained iron-tyred wheels until pneumatic tyres began to be introduced just before World War II.

When the RFA merged into the Royal Artillery on 1 June 1924, the unit became a 'Field Brigade, RA' In July 1925 the subtitle of the Colchester battery was changed to 'Essex RHA', commemorating the Essex Royal Horse Artillery that had been disbanded in 1919. On 1 October 1932, 339 (Essex RHA) Bty transferred to 104th (Essex Yeomanry) Fd Bde and was replaced by 213 Bty, converted from 232 Medium Bty (formerly the East Anglian (Essex) RGA, see above) of 58th (Essex and Suffolk) Medium Bde. This battery had always shared the brigade's HQ at Stratford.

In 1938 the RA modernised its nomenclature and a lieutenant-colonel's command was designated a 'regiment' rather than a 'brigade'; this applied to TA field brigades from 1 November 1938. The TA was doubled in size after the Munich Crisis, and most regiments split to form duplicates. Part of the reorganisation was that field regiments changed from four six-gun batteries to an establishment of two batteries, each of three four-gun troops. 85th (East Anglian) Field Rgt formed 134th Field Rgt as its duplicate from 24 June 1939:

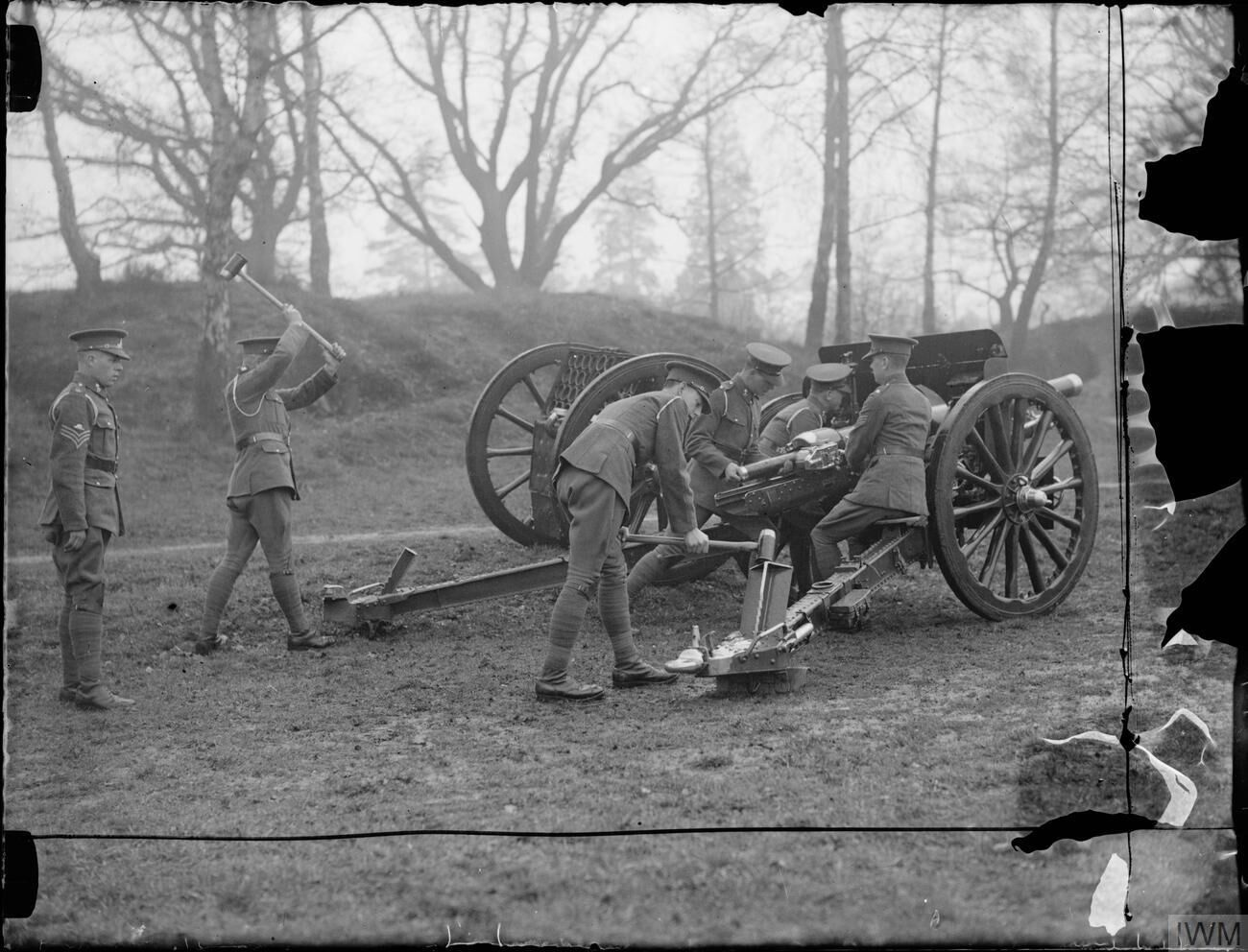
Emplacing an 18-pounder with wooden wheels at the start of World War II

85th (East Anglian) Field Regiment

- Regimental Headquarters (RHQ) at Stratford Green
- 337 (Essex) Fd Bty
- 338 (Essex) Fd Bty

134th Field Regiment

- RHQ at Stratford Green
- 213 (Essex) Fd Bty
- 340 (Essex) Fd Bty

== World War II ==
Both 85th and 134th (East Anglian) Field Rgts were serving with 54th (EA) Division in Eastern Command when it mobilised on the outbreak of war.

One of the lessons learned from the Battle of France was that the two-battery organisation did not work: field regiments were intended to support an infantry brigade of three battalions. As a result, they were reorganised into three 8-gun batteries, but it was not until late 1940 that the RA had enough trained battery staffs to carry out the reorganisation. 85th (EA) Field Rgt accordingly formed 'R' Fd Bty on 4 November 1940 when the regiment was stationed at Gosforth Park, Newcastle upon Tyne, while 54th (EA) Division was serving in X Corps; it was numbered 461 Fd Bty by 31 January 1941. Similarly, 134th Fd Rgt formed 498 Fd Bty about 1 January 1941 when it was stationed at Stanley, County Durham. 134th Field Rgt was authorised to adopt its parent unit's 'East Anglian' subtitle on 17 February 1942.

In January 1942 54th (EA) Division was placed on a lower establishment, an acknowledgement that it was not going to be sent on active service. 85th (East Anglian) Field Rgt later served in Persia and Iraq Command (PAIFORCE) and then converted to mountain artillery, in which role it fought in the Italian Campaign. It was placed in suspended animation on 27 September 1945. 134th Field Rgt was shipped to India, where it first became a jungle field regiment and then a medium regiment, in which role it served in the Burma Campaign. It passed into suspended animation on 31 March 1946.

== Postwar ==
When the TA was reconstituted on 1 January 1947, 134th Medium Rgt was disbanded and 85th Mountain Rgt was reformed as 285 (Essex) Airborne Light Rgt with RHQ and P Bty at Artillery House, Stratford Green. The regiment formed part of the TA's 16th Airborne Division.

On 28 May 1951 the regiment became 285 (Essex) Airborne Field Rgt, and on 27 June 1955 it was redesignated again as 285 (Essex) Parachute Field Rgt. However, 16th Airborne Division was disbanded in 1956 and the number of air-portable units was reduced. On 31 October 1956 the regiment merged with 292 (5th London) Parachute Field Rgt to form 289 Parachute Light Rgt in 44th Independent Parachute Brigade Group. This regiment in turn was reduced to 289 Parachute Battery, Royal Horse Artillery, in 1967.

== Honorary colonels ==
The following served as Honorary Colonel of the unit:

- Thomas White, appointed to 3rd Essex AVC 20 February 1869
- Sir William Makins, 1st Baronet, MP, VD, former CO, appointed to 3rd Essex AVC 23 April 1874
- R.M. Laurie, DSO, TD, former CO, appointed 7 March 1922
- Charles Howard-Bury, DSO, MP, appointed 30 July 1927
- H.R. Wilson, DSO, TD, former CO, appointed 30 July 1932
- W.J. Bransden, TD, former CO, appointed 21 March 1938

== Memorials ==
There is a memorial plaque to the men of the 1st Essex VA who served in the Second Boer War in St John's Church, Stratford.

There is a memorial at the Army Reserve Centre at Romford, originally at Artillery House, Stratford, in memory of the men of 2nd East Anglian Bde, RFA, and the other units based there who died in 1914–18.
