= Dixwell baronets of Coton House (1716) =

Escutcheon of the Dixwell baronets

The Dixwell baronetcy, of Coton House in Warwickshire, was created in the Baronetage of Great Britain on 11 June 1716 for William Dixwell, who was High Sheriff of Warwickshire in that year. It became extinct on his death in 1757.

William Dixwell was a great-great-grandson of Charles Dixwell of Coton House. He married in 1712 Mary Cave, daughter of Roger Cave with his second wife Mary Bromley, daughter of Sir William Bromley of Baginton; Mary Cave therefore had William Bromley, Speaker of the House of Commons at the time of her marriage, as her uncle.

Mary Dixwell died in 1713 or 1714. William Dixwell died childless and a widower; his kin were a nephew William Dixwell Grimes, and a nephew Anna Maria, wife of William Cracroft.

== Notes ==
Baronetage of Great Britain
Preceded by Sloane baronets	Dixwell baronets of Coton House; 11 June 1716	Succeeded by Dutry baronets
