= Ward baronets of Wellington (1911) =

Ward baronets
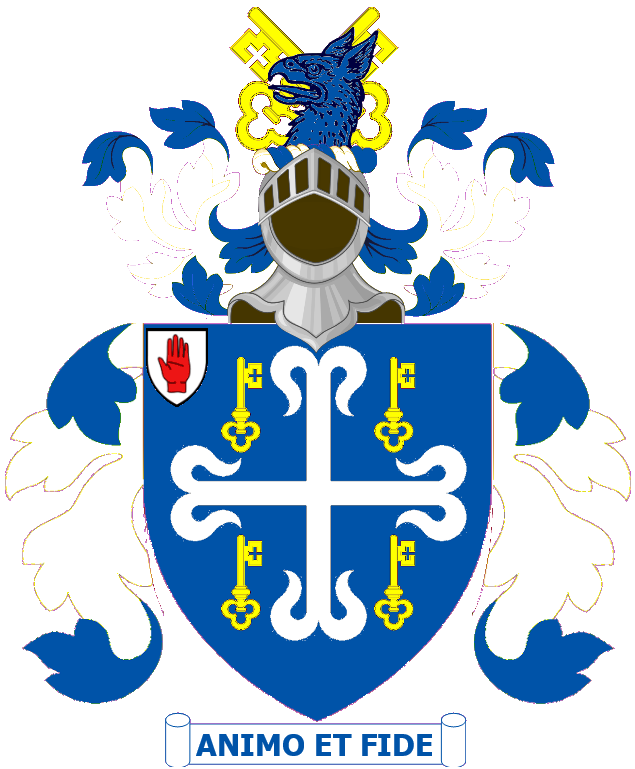
- Escutcheon of the Ward baronets of Wellington
- Creation date: 1911
- Status: extant
- Motto: Animo et fide, By courage and faith
- Arms: Azure a cross moline Argent between four keys wards upwards Or
- Crest: A demi-griffin Azure in front of two keys in saltire wards upwards Or

The Ward baronetcy, of Wellington in New Zealand, was created in the Baronetage of the United Kingdom on 20 June 1911 for Joseph Ward, Prime Minister of New Zealand from 1906 to 1912, and then 1928 to 1930.

The Official Roll marks the title "vacant".

== Ward baronets, of Wellington (1911) ==
- Sir Joseph George Ward, 1st Baronet (1856–1930)
- Sir Cyril Rupert Joseph Ward, 2nd Baronet (1884–1940)
- Sir Joseph George Davidson Ward, 3rd Baronet (1909–1970)
- Sir Joseph James Laffey Ward, 4th Baronet (1946–2021)
- Joseph James Martin Ward, presumed 5th Baronet (born 1971), has not proved his claim to the title.

The heir presumptive is the current holder's uncle Roderic Anthony Ward (born 1948).

== Extended family ==
- The 1st Baronet's younger son Vincent Ward was also a politician.

== Notes ==
Baronetage of the United Kingdom
Preceded by Younger baronets	Ward baronets of Wellington; 20 June 1911	Succeeded by Perrott baronets
