= Younger baronets of Auchen Castle (1911) =

Escutcheon of the Younger baronets of Auchen Castle

The Younger baronetcy, of Auchen Castle in Scotland, was created in 1911 for William Younger, Member of Parliament for Stamford from 1895 to 1906 and briefly for Peebles and Selkirkshire.

== Younger baronets, of Auchen Castle (1911) ==
- Sir William Younger, 1st Baronet (1862–1937)
- Sir William Robert Younger, 2nd Baronet (1888–1973)
- Sir John William Younger, 3rd Baronet (1920–2002)
- Sir Julian William Richard Younger, 4th Baronet (1950–2019)
- Sir Andrew William Younger Thieriot, 5th Baronet (born 1986)

== Notes ==
Baronetage of the United Kingdom
Preceded by Waechter baronets	Younger baronets of Auchen Castle; 14 February 1911	Succeeded by Ward baronets
