= Prince-Smith baronets =

Extinct baronetcy in the Baronetage of the United Kingdom

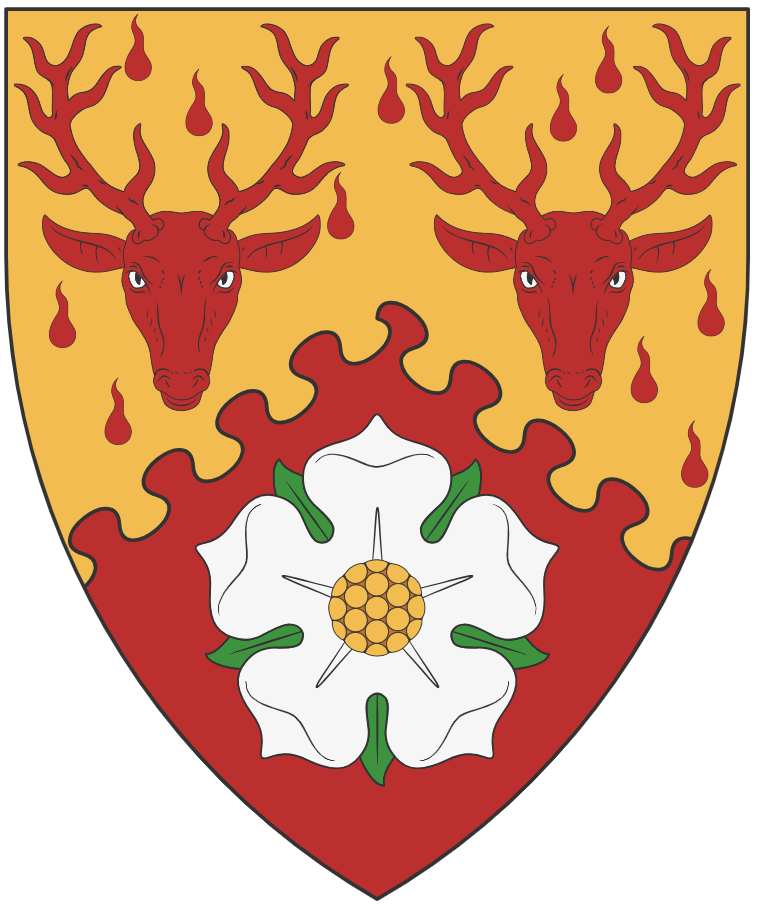
Arms of Prince-Smith of Hillbrook: Per chevron nebuly or guttee de sang and gules, two stags' heads cabossed in chief of the last and a rose in base argent, barbed and seeded proper

The Smith, later Prince-Smith baronetcy, of Hillbrook, Keighley in the County of York, was a title in the Baronetage of the United Kingdom. It was created on 11 February 1911 for Prince Smith, head of Prince Smith & Son, later Prince-Smith & Stells, textile engineers, of Keighley. The 2nd Baronet assumed the additional surname of Prince by deed poll in 1922.

The title became extinct on the death of the 4th Baronet in 2007.

== Smith, later Prince-Smith baronets, of Hillbrook (1911) ==
- Sir Prince Smith, 1st Baronet (1840–1922)
- Sir Prince Prince-Smith, 2nd Baronet (1869–1940)
- Sir William Prince-Smith, 3rd Baronet (1898–1964)
- Sir William Richard Prince-Smith, 4th Baronet (1928–2007)

Baronetage of the United Kingdom
Preceded by Raphael baronets	Smith baronets of Hillbrook; 11 February 1911	Succeeded by Waechter baronets
