= Max Waechter =

German-British businessman and philanthropist (1837–1924)

- Born: 29 July 1837; Stettin, Germany
- Died: 1924 (aged 86–87)
- Occupations: businessman, art collector and philanthropist
- Known for: his advocacy of a federal Europe

Sir Max Leonard Waechter (29 July 1837 – 3 October 1924) was a businessman, art collector, philanthropist and advocate of a federal Europe.

== Career ==
Waechter was born in Stettin, then in Germany and now Szczecin in Poland. His father was Julius Leonard Waechter, a Lutheran pastor. He went to England in 1859 and was naturalised as a British citizen in 1865.

Waechter became a partner in Bessler, Waechter, and Co., a merchant firm. He advocated improved relations between Britain and Germany and in 1913 founded the European Federation League.

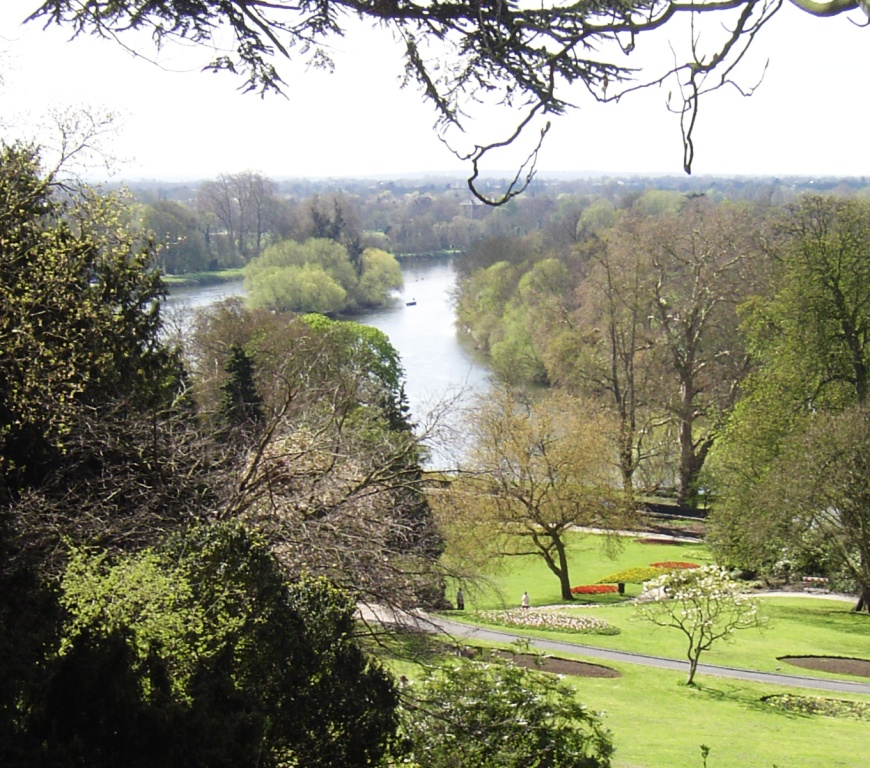
Glover's Island from Richmond Hill

Waechter lived in Terrace House on Richmond Hill. He held the post of High Sheriff of Surrey in 1902.

Waechter was made a Knight Bachelor in the 1902 Birthday Honours and knighted by King Edward VII at Buckingham Palace on 18 December 1902.

== Family ==
Waechter married twice. His first wife, whom he married at St John the Divine, Richmond in 1873, was Harriett Shallcross, whose father, the Liberal MP Thomas Cave, owned Queensberry House. His second wife was Armatrude Hobart. His only son, Harry Waechter, also a businessman and philanthropist, was created a baronet in 1911.

== Death and legacy ==
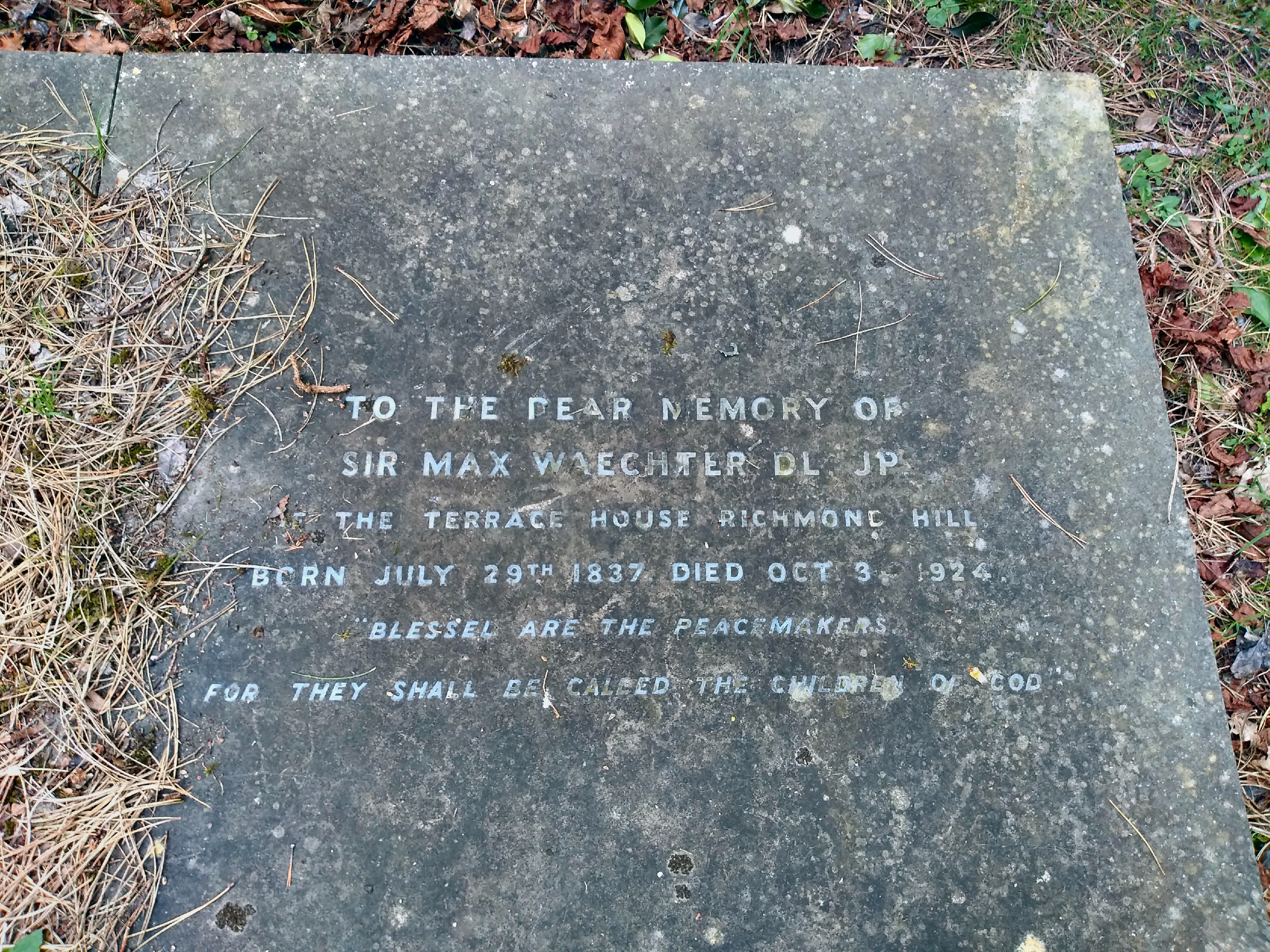
Richmond Cemetery

Waechter contributed, anonymously, to a fund established to erect a memorial in Richmond to Princess Mary, Duchess of Teck; a memorial fountain was erected outside the Richmond Gate to Richmond Park. Waechter owned Glover's Island which he donated to the Borough of Richmond in 1900. He helped preserve the view from Richmond across the river by preventing destructive development.

Waechter died in 1924 and is buried in Richmond Cemetery.

== Publications ==
- Waechter, Max: European Federation: A Lecture Delivered at the London Institution on the 25th February 1909, Jordan & Sons, Limited, 1909, 15pp.
- Waechter, Max: The United States of Europe: How to Make War Impossible, Twentieth Century Press, 1922, 11pp.
- Waechter, Max: How to Abolish War: The United States of Europe, 1924, 12pp.
- Waechter, Max: The Principal Lesson of the Balkan Wars OCLC 82740175

== See also ==
- Richmond, Petersham and Ham Open Spaces Act 1902
