= Perrott baronets of Plumstead (1st creation, 1716) =

Escutcheon of the Perrott baronets of Plumstead

The Perrott baronetcy of Plumstead in Kent was created on 1 July 1716 for James Perrott. Cokayne notes confusion over his given name, and regards as spurious the claim of a 1611 creation for Perrot(t). The documentation of the title dates from 1767 in the time of the 2nd Baronet. (He chooses, contra Burke, to number the 2nd Baronet as 1st Baronet of a re-creation.)

- Sir James Perrott, 1st Baronet (died 1731); also listed as Sir Robert Perrott,
- Sir Richard Perrott, 2nd Baronet (c. 1716–1796)
- Sir Edward Bindloss Perrott, 3rd Baronet (1 September 1784 – 24 March 1859) He married in 1810, Louisa Augusta Bayly (died 1860, aged 81), a niece of Henry Bayly Paget, 1st Earl of Uxbridge, and cousin of the 1st Marquess of Anglesey.
- Sir Edward George Lambert Perrott, 4th Baronet (10 May 1811 – 4 June 1886)
- Sir Herbert Charles Perrott, 5th Baronet (26 October 1849 – 15 February 1922) (extinct on his death).

== Notes ==
Baronetage of Great Britain
Preceded by Dutry baronets	Perrott baronets of Plumstead; 1 July 1716	Succeeded by D'Aeth baronets
