= Harry Waechter =

British businessman and philanthropist (1871–1929)

Sir Harry Sedan Waechter, 1st Baronet CMG DL (6 June 1871 – 20 May 1929) was a British businessman and philanthropist.

The only son of Sir Max Waechter, Harry Sedan Waechter was born in Newcastle upon Tyne and educated at Clifton College and Trinity College, Cambridge. started developing the garden, "Ramsnest" (now "Ramster") near Chiddingfold, Surrey, which he purchased sometime between 1890 and 1900. He also owned property in Salisbury, Southern Rhodesia (present-day Harare, Zimbabwe). He was made a partner in Bessler, Waechter & Co. in 1901. Waechter was appointed a deputy lieutenant of the County of London in September 1909.

He was raised to the Baronetage in the 1911 New Year Honours. He is described in The Times article as "Henry Waechter, Esq, Managing Director of the firm of Bessler, Waechter and Co. Limited, Shippers and Ship owners of which Sir Max Waechter is Chairman. Has given generous support to the Territorial Force and Cadet Corps in Surrey. High Sheriff of Surrey in 1910 and Master of the Chiddingfold Foxhounds." In 1907, he instituted a Band Competition, held at Ramsnest.

In 1912, he gave land in Woodbridge Road, Guildford to Guildford Borough Council, in trust, with cricket included in the objects of the Trust. This land is now the home of Guildford Cricket Club.

He served in World War I (1914–1918) in France and in Italy he received the Croix de Guerre. He was appointed a Companion of the Order of St Michael and St George in the 1919 New Year Honours for his efforts during the First World War.

== Family ==
He married Evelyn Mary Josephine d'Arcy (died 1955), daughter of John d'Arcy, in 1911. D’Arcy was an early member of the First Aid Nursing Yeomanry, an all female volunteer Corps, formed in 1907 as a mounted unit to rescue wounded soldiers from the battlefield. Based in London, the FANY used Chiddingfold for some early training camps. The couple had two sons and a daughter. They divorced on 15 December 1923.

== Death ==
Lord Waechter died in Salisbury, Southern Rhodesia (present-day Harare, Zimbabwe) on 20 May 1929, shortly before his 58th birthday. He was succeeded as Baronet by his son, Harry Leonard d'Arcy Waechter (born 22 May 1912–died 10 January 1985). The baronetcy became extinct upon the latter's death, in 1985.

Baronetage of the United Kingdom
New creation	Baronet (of Ramsnest); 1911–1929	Succeeded by Harry Leonard d'Arcy Waechter
