= 16th Airborne Division =

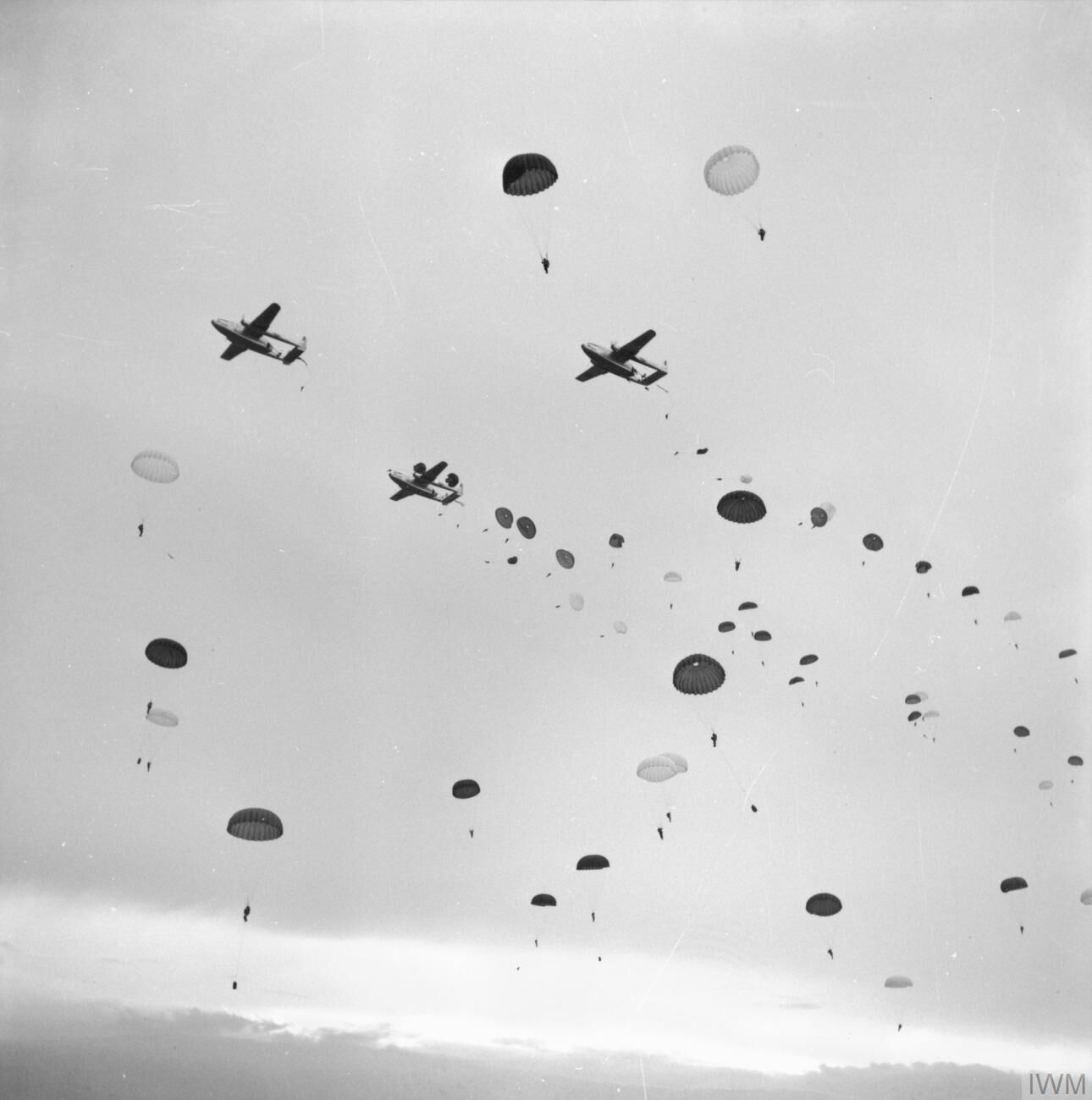
- Divisional parachute drop during Exercise King's Joker at the Stanford Parachute Training Area in Kent
- Active: 1947–1956
- Country: United Kingdom
- Branch: British Army
- Type: Infantry
- Role: Airborne forces
- Size: Division
- Garrison/HQ: London
- Nickname: Red Devils

Insignia
- Emblem of the British Airborne Forces

The 16th Airborne Division was an airborne infantry division of the British Territorial Army. It was first commanded by Major-General Roy Urquhart, and had its divisional headquarters in London.

It was raised in 1947, to compensate for the loss of the 1st Airborne Division, which had been disbanded in 1945 and the 6th Airborne Division which was to be disbanded in 1948. The number "16" was used in recognition of the two wartime airborne divisions.

The division had three parachute brigades, the 4th, 5th and the 6th, each with three Territorial battalions of the Parachute Regiment. The brigades were renumbered the 44th, 45th and 46th in 1950. Then in December 1955, the British Secretary of State for War in an announcement on the future of the Territorial Army, proposed cutting the Territorial Battalion, The Parachute Regiments by five. The reduction in strength led to the disbandment of the division in 1956, leaving the 44th Independent Parachute Group as the only British reserve parachute formation.

299 Parachute Squadron, Royal Engineers

== Units pre-1950 ==
- 16th Airborne Divisional Signal Regiment (Middlesex Yeomanry), Royal Corps of Signals
- 16th Airborne Division Field Security Section, Intelligence Corps
- North Somerset Yeomanry (Royal Armoured Corps)
- 16th Airborne Divisional (Lincoln) Independent Company
- 21st Special Air Service Regiment
- 16th Airborne Division Ordnance Field Park, Royal Army Ordnance Corps
- 16th Airborne Division Provost Company, Royal Military Police
- 4th Parachute Brigade
  - 10th (County of London) Battalion, The Parachute Regiment
  - 11th (Middlesex) Battalion, The Parachute Regiment
  - 14th Battalion, The Parachute Regiment
- 5th Parachute Brigade
  - 12th (Yorkshire) Battalion, The Parachute Regiment
  - 17th (Durham Light Infantry) Battalion, The Parachute Regiment
  - 18th (Warwickshire) Battalion, The Parachute Regiment
- 6th Parachute Brigade
  - 13th (Lancashire) Battalion, Parachute Regiment
  - 15th (Scottish) Battalion, Parachute Regiment
  - 16th (Welsh) Battalion, Parachute Regiment
- 16th Airborne Division Royal Artillery
  - 880 Forward Observation Battery, Royal Artillery
  - 285th (Essex) Airborne Light Regiment, Royal Artillery
  - 291st (4th London) Airborne Field Regiment, Royal Artillery
  - 292nd (5th London) Airborne Field Regiment, Royal Artillery
  - 629th (Cambridgeshire Regiment) Airborne Light Regiment, Royal Artillery
  - 446th (Royal Welch) Airborne Light Anti-Aircraft Regiment, Royal Artillery
- 16th Airborne Division Royal Engineers
  - 131st Airborne Engineer Regiment
- 16th Airborne Division Royal Army Medical Corps
  - 4th Parachute Field Ambulance (44th Parachute Field Ambulance from 1950)
  - 5th Parachute Field Ambulance (45th Parachute Field Ambulance from 1950)
  - 6th Parachute Field Ambulance (46th Parachute Field Ambulance from 1950)
  - 1 x Reserve Medical Section
- 16th Airborne Divisional Column Royal Army Service Corps
  - 1560 Company RASC
  - 1561 Company RASC
  - 1562 Company RASC
- 16th Airborne Division Royal Electrical and Mechanical Engineers
  - 4th Airborne Workshop REME (44th Airborne Workshop REME from 1950)
  - 5th Airborne Workshop REME (45th Airborne Workshop REME from 1950)
  - 6th Airborne Workshop REME (46th Airborne Workshop REME from 1950)

== Commanders ==
- January 1947 Major-General Roy Urquhart
- December 1948 Major-General Gerald Lathbury
- October 1951 Major-General Geoffrey Bourne
- 1953 Major-General Francis Rome
