= List of shipwrecks in 1950 =

The list of shipwrecks in 1950 includes ships sunk, foundered, grounded, or otherwise lost during 1950.

table of contents
1950
Jan	Feb	Mar	Apr
May	Jun	Jul	Aug
Sep	Oct	Nov	Dec
Unknown date

== January ==
=== 12 January ===
List of shipwrecks: 12 January 1950
Ship	State	Description
HMS Truculent	Royal Navy	The T-class submarine was sunk in collision with oil tanker Divina (Sweden). A total of 64 crew killed. Submarine later salvaged and scrapped.

=== 15 January ===
List of shipwrecks: 15 January 1950
Ship	State	Description
HMS Thermopylae	Royal Navy	The T-class submarine ran aground on Stevenson Rock, off Skerryvore, Inner Hebrides.

=== 16 January ===
List of shipwrecks: 11 January 1950
Ship	State	Description
BO-42	South Molluccan rebels	Battle of Namlea: The Higgins patrol boat was sunk by KRI Pati Unus (Indonesian Navy).
Jai Lang	South Molluccan rebels	Battle of Namlea: The Higgins patrol boat was sunk by KRI Pati Unus (Indonesian Navy).

=== 17 January ===
List of shipwrecks: 17 January 1950
Ship	State	Description
USS Missouri	United States Navy	USS Missouri aground in Chesapeake Bay The Iowa-class battleship ran aground in Chesapeake Bay. She was refloated on 1 February.

=== 21 January ===
List of shipwrecks: 21 January 1950
Ship	State	Description
Sea Shell	United States	The 11-gross register ton, 33.7-foot (10.3 m) fishing vessel was destroyed by fire at Gambier Point (57°26′00″N 133°50′15″W) on Admiralty Island in Southeast Alaska.

=== 27 January ===
List of shipwrecks: 27 January 1950
Ship	State	Description
Delta	Netherlands	The coaster was in collision with the collier Colonel Crompton (United Kingdom) in the River Thames near Tower Bridge, London and sank.

=== 29 January ===
List of shipwrecks: 29 January 1950
Ship	State	Description
Edirne	Turkey	The cargo ship ran aground on the Ortach Reef, Alderney, Channel Islands. Floated free and sank the next day. All 50 crew were rescued.
Vordur	Iceland	The 188.1-foot (57.3 m), 655-ton trawler foundered 170 miles (270 km) south of Iceland. Five crew were killed, while the rest of the crew were rescued by an Icelandic trawler.

=== 31 January ===
List of shipwrecks: 31 January 1950
Ship	State	Description
Fidamas	West Germany	The coaster struck a mine and sank off Langeoog, Netherlands with the loss of eight of her sixteen crew. The survivors were rescued by the tug Rumania (United Kingdom).
Rask	Norway	The coaster ran aground at Scremerston, Northumberland, United Kingdom. All sixteen on board were rescued.

== February ==
=== 1 February ===
List of shipwrecks: 1 February 1950
Ship	State	Description
William Ashburner	United Kingdom	The schooner ran aground in the River Severn off Chepstow, Monmouthshire and was wrecked.

=== 10 February ===
List of shipwrecks: 10 February 1950
Ship	State	Description
Marchioness	United Kingdom	The collier was in collision with Durmitor (Yugoslavia) in the Thames Estuary at Greenhithe, London and sank. All twelve crew were rescued.

=== 11 February ===
List of shipwrecks: 11 February 1950
Ship	State	Description
Karhula	Finland	The cargo ship sank off Texel, Netherlands with the loss of eleven of her 27 crew. The two stowaways on board were rescued.

=== 12 February ===
List of shipwrecks: 12 February 1950
Ship	State	Description
Stag	Hong Kong	The tug capsized and sank 5 nautical miles (9.3 km) south of the mouth of the River Wear whilst towing unfinished ocean liner City of Manchester (United Kingdom). Four of her six crew were killed.
Wing Hing	Hong Kong	The coaster caught fire and was beached at Chilang Point, China. She was on a voyage from Amoy, China to Hong Kong. She was declared a total loss.

=== 21 February ===
List of shipwrecks: 21 February 1950
Ship	State	Description
Clam	United Kingdom	The tanker ran aground near the Reykjanes Lighthouse, Reykjavík, Iceland. Twenty-seven of her 50 crew were drowned when their lifeboats capsized. Declared a total loss on 5 March.

=== 24 February ===
List of shipwrecks: 24 February 1950
Ship	State	Description
Arrow	United States	The 38-gross register ton, 58.8-foot (17.9 m) fishing vessel was destroyed by fire off the east coast of "Mary Island" – most likely Mary Island (58°04′N 157°29′W) – in Southeast Alaska.
Benledi	United Kingdom	The cargo ship caught fire east of Malta and was abandoned. Later repaired and returned to service.
Empire Gladstone	United Kingdom	The cargo ship ran aground eight nautical miles (15 km) north of Twofold Point, New South Wales, Australia (35°56′S 149°57′E) and was declared a total loss.

=== 25 February ===
List of shipwrecks: 25 February 1950
Ship	State	Description
Olga Topic	Yugoslavia	The cargo ship caught fire and was abandoned south east of the Saint Peter and Saint Paul Archipelago, Brazil. She was on a voyage from Rosario to Rotterdam, South Holland, Netherlands. The fire was extinguished and she was taken in tow for Fortaleza, Brazil, but the fire re-ignited and she was burnt out. Olga Topic was declared a constructive total loss.

== March ==
=== 9 March ===
List of shipwrecks: 9 March 1950
Ship	State	Description
Pioneer	Australia	The dredger was scuttled off Point Lonsdale, Victoria, Australia.

=== 15 March ===
List of shipwrecks: 15 March 1950
Ship	State	Description
Sainte Anne	France	Last communication from the ship off the Balearic Islands, no further trace.

=== 17 March ===
List of shipwrecks: 17 March 1950
Ship	State	Description
Elsie	United States	The 8-gross register ton, 33.5-foot (10.2 m) fishing vessel disappeared during a voyage from Seattle, Washington, to the Territory of Alaska with the loss of the two men on board.

=== 26 March ===
List of shipwrecks: 26 March 1950
Ship	State	Description
Voorwarts	Netherlands	The coaster en route from Littlehampton to Saint Malo in ballast ran aground on the Paternoster Reef, off Jersey, Channel Islands and was abandoned and sank.

=== 28 March ===
List of shipwrecks: 28 March 1950
Ship	State	Description
Ambrose Lightship	United States Lighthouse Service	The lightship was rammed by Santa Monica (United States) and holed above the waterline. She was withdrawn from service for repairs.
HMS FPB 1030	Royal Navy	The Vosper 73 ft fast patrol boat (formerly the Motor Torpedo Boat HMS MTB 530) sank after a collision with sister fast patrol boat HMS FPB 532 (Royal Navy) 30 miles (48 km) off the Hook of Holland during a naval exercise.

== April ==
=== 10 April ===
List of shipwrecks: 10 April 1950
Ship	State	Description
Halladale	United Kingdom	The ferry ran aground at Calais, France. Refloated later that day.

=== 12 April ===
List of shipwrecks: 12 April 1950
Ship	State	Description
Shangri-La	United States	The 8-gross register ton, 31.3-foot (9.5 m) fishing vessel was destroyed by fire during a voyage in Southeast Alaska from Sitka to Pelican.

=== 18 April ===
List of shipwrecks: 18 April 1950
Ship	State	Description
Sandra	Costa Rica	The small freighter was declared overdue, apparently lost in bad weather while en route from Savannah to Puerto Cabello, Venezuela.

=== 29 April ===
List of shipwrecks: 29 April 1950
Ship	State	Description
Mary Heeley	United Kingdom	The 101.2-foot (30.8 m) trawler was wrecked on rocks at Howstrake, Onchan, Isle of Man. Crew taken off by the Douglas Lifeboat. She broke up in bad weather the next day.

== May ==
=== 2 May ===
List of shipwrecks: 2 May 1950
Ship	State	Description
Falcon	United States	The 26-gross register ton, 45.3-foot (13.8 m) fishing vessel sank 10 nautical miles (19 km; 12 mi) east of Mitrofania Island (55°53′N 159°50′W) on the south coast of the Alaska Peninsula in the Territory of Alaska.

=== 5 May ===
List of shipwrecks: 5 May 1950
Ship	State	Description
America	United States	The 32-foot (9.8 m), 13-gross register ton fishing boat sank during a storm in Sturgeon Bay 5 nautical miles (9.3 km; 5.8 mi) north of Sturgeon Bay, Wisconsin, at 44°54.030′N 087°24.898′W.

=== 7 May ===
List of shipwrecks: 7 May 1950
Ship	State	Description
City of Lincoln	United Kingdom	The hulk of the cargo liner was sunk as a target by the South African Air Force off Cape Town.

=== 10 May ===
List of shipwrecks: 10 May 1950
Ship	State	Description
Midget	United States	During a voyage from Cordova, Territory of Alaska, to Seattle, Washington, the 12-gross register ton, 33.3-foot (10.1 m) purse seiner disappeared in the Gulf of Alaska with the loss of all three people aboard.

=== 15 May ===
List of shipwrecks: 15 May 1950
Ship	State	Description
Marietta Dal	United Kingdom	The Liberty ship was wrecked at Cape Moreton, Queensland, Australia. She was on a voyage from Galveston, Texas, United States to Adelaide, South Australia.

=== 24 May ===
List of shipwrecks: 24 May 1950
Ship	State	Description
Double Knot	United States	The 15-gross register ton, 34.1-foot (10.4 m) fishing vessel was wrecked on the south-central coast of the Territory of Alaska 15 nautical miles (28 km; 17 mi) east of Cape Saint Elias. One man on board perished.
Ebonol	United Kingdom	The tanker sank three miles (4.8 km) off Sugar Loaf Island, south of Swatow, China in bad weather. There were reports of a possible explosion from a mine.

=== 25 May ===
List of shipwrecks: 15 May 1950
Ship	State	Description
Gui Shan	People's Liberation Army Navy	Chinese Civil War: Battle of Wanshan Archipelago: The landing craft infantry was sunk by Nationalist ships.
ROCS No. 25	Republic of China Navy	Chinese Civil War: Battle of Wanshan Archipelago: The auxiliary gunboat was captured by Fen Dou ( People's Liberation Army Navy). Two crewmen were killed and seven were taken as prisoners of war. Later the vessel was set adrift in sinking condition due to battle damage.
ROCS No. 26	Republic of China Navy	Chinese Civil War: Battle of Wanshan Archipelago: The auxiliary gunboat was shelled, blew up and sunk by Fen Dou ( People's Liberation Army Navy). The vessel was lost with all ten hands.

=== 26 May ===
List of shipwrecks: 26 May 1950
Ship	State	Description
Cabo Espartel	Spain	The cargo ship collided with the steamer Felspar (United Kingdom) in the English Channel off Dungeness, Kent, England. All 37 crew were rescued. Felspar was beached south of Deal, Kent.

== June ==
=== 1 June ===
List of shipwrecks: 1 June 1950
Ship	State	Description
Sand Runner	United Kingdom	The coaster ran aground at St. Ives Head. All crew saved. Ship refloated the following day.

=== 6 June ===
List of shipwrecks: 6 June 1950
Ship	State	Description
Santo Maru	Japan	The cargo ship was wrecked off Aghennasaki, Miyakojima.

=== 19 June ===
List of shipwrecks: 19 June 1950
Ship	State	Description
Indian Enterprise	India	The cargo ship exploded and sank 300 nautical miles (560 km) south of Suez, Egypt. She was on a voyage from Bremen, West Germany to Calcutta.
Santos	Panama	The passenger-cargo ship hit a mine and sank in the Yangtze River near Wusong, People's Republic of China.

=== 22 June ===
List of shipwrecks: 22 June 1950
Ship	State	Description
Ormen Friske	Sweden	The Viking ship replica was last sighted in the North Sea on this date. She subsequently foundered off Pellworm, West Germany with the loss of all fourteen crew. She was on a voyage from Birka to Rotterdam, South Holland, Netherlands.

=== 23 June ===
List of shipwrecks: 23 June 1950
Ship	State	Description
Fairwind	Australia	The survey vessel foundered off New South Wales with the loss of all seventeen crew.

=== 26 June ===
List of shipwrecks: 26 June 1950
Ship	State	Description
Lutterworth	New Zealand	The barque was sunk as a target by Royal New Zealand Air Force aircraft.
Unidentified troop transport	Korean People's Army Naval Force	Korean War: The unidentified troop transport was shelled and sunk in the Korean Straits off Pusan, South Korea by Baekdusan (Republic of Korea Navy) with the loss of up to 600 crew and troops.

=== 29 June ===
List of shipwrecks: 29 June 1950
Ship	State	Description
Dumangang	Republic of Korea Navy	Korean War: Battle of Gangneung: The Daejeon-class minesweeper was shelled and sunk by No. 31 ( Korean People's Army Naval Force).
Unknown schooner	Korean People's Army Naval Force	Korean War: Battle of Gangneung: The supply schooner was shelled and sunk by USS Juneau and USS De Haven (both United States Navy).

== July ==
=== 2 July ===
List of shipwrecks: 2 July 1950
Ship	State	Description
No.22, No.23, and No.24	Korean People's Army Naval Force	Korean War: Battle of Chumonchin Chan: The G-5-class motor torpedo boats were shelled by USS Juneau (United States Navy), HMS Black Swan and HMS Jamaica (both Royal Navy). Two were sunk and one was damaged and beached/wrecked.
No.1, and No.2	Korean People's Army Naval Force	Korean War: Battle of Chumonchin Chan: The two OD-200 Type patrol boats were shelled and sunk by USS Juneau (United States Navy), HMS Black Swan and HMS Jamaica (both Royal Navy).

=== 3 July ===
List of shipwrecks: 3 July 1950
Ship	State	Description
Unknown schooners	Korean People's Army Naval Force	Korean War: Three supply schooners were shelled and sunk by Gimcheon (Republic of Korea Navy).
Unknown trawlers	Korean People's Army Naval Force	Korean War: A convoy of seven trawlers was shelled and sunk by USS Juneau (United States Navy).

=== 5 July ===
List of shipwrecks: 5 July 1950
Ship	State	Description
Barnet	United Kingdom	The vessel, standing guard overnight under HMS Warspite's bow at Prussia Cove, Cornwall, was holed in the engine room, towed off and eventually drifted ashore at Long Rock, a few miles to the west.

=== 9 July ===
List of shipwrecks: 9 July 1950
Ship	State	Description
Ranheim	Norway	The cargo ship was wrecked off Kapp Borthen, Svalbard.

=== 10 July ===
List of shipwrecks: 10 July 1950
Ship	State	Description
No. 3	People's Liberation Army Navy	Chinese Civil War: The gunboat was sunk by a Nationalist Chinese auxiliary gunboat at Dachen Island. 12 crewmen killed, 5 survivors.

=== 12 July ===
List of shipwrecks: 12 July 1950
Ship	State	Description
Franconia	United Kingdom	The ocean liner ran aground at Île d'Orléans, Quebec, Canada. Refloated on 16 July. All 1,272 passengers and crew rescued.
Xin Bao Shun	Republic of China Navy	Chinese Civil War: Battle of Pishan Island: The gunboat was shelled by Red Chinese ships, then rammed and sunk by No. 107 ( People's Liberation Army Navy) at Pishan Island.

=== 14 July ===
List of shipwrecks: 14 July 1950
Ship	State	Description
Ammunition lighters	Royal Navy	An explosion on an ammunition lighter at Portsmouth, England set off secondary explosions sinking or destroying a total of six to nine lighters.

=== 16 July ===
List of shipwrecks: 16 July 1950
Ship	State	Description
Jai Lang and BO-42	South Moluccas rebels	Battle of Namlea: The Higgins boats were sunk by KRI Pati Unus (Indonesian Navy)

=== 22 July ===
List of shipwrecks: 22 July 1950
Ship	State	Description
Unknown	Korean People's Army Naval Force	Korean War: Three small ships were shelled and sunk by Gimcheon (Republic of Korea Navy).

=== 24 July ===
List of shipwrecks: 24 July 1950
Ship	State	Description
San Antonio	Philippines	Chinese Civil War: The cargo ship was sunk by a mine off Woosung, China in the Yangtze River.

=== 26 July ===
List of shipwrecks: 26 July 1950
Ship	State	Description
Gaza	Royal Egyptian Navy	The Arish-class minesweeper blew up and sank from a fuel tank explosion off Mersa Matruh.

=== 27 July ===
List of shipwrecks: 22 July 1950
Ship	State	Description
Unknown	Korean People's Army Naval Force	Korean War: A convoy of 12 small sailing vessels were shelled and sunk by Guemgangsan and Samgakson (both Republic of Korea Navy).

== August ==
=== 2 August ===
List of shipwrecks: 2 August 1950
Ship	State	Description
Unknown steamship	Unknown	Korean War: The steamer was shelled and sunk in Mokpo Harbor by HMS Cockade and HMS Cossack (both Royal Navy).

=== 3 August ===
List of shipwrecks: 3 August 1950
Ship	State	Description
Unknown motorboats	Korean People's Army Naval Force	Korean War: Two motorboats were shelled and sunk by Gyeongju (Republic of Korea Navy).
Unknown vessels	Korean People's Army Naval Force	Korean War: Four small vessels were shelled and sunk by an unknown South Korean warship.

=== 4 August ===
List of shipwrecks: 4 August 1950
Ship	State	Description
St. Merriel	United Kingdom	World War II: The stern section of the cargo ship sank in the Mediterranean Sea (44°05′20″N 8°33′50″E) whilst under tow for breaking.

=== 7 August ===
List of shipwrecks: 7 August 1950
Ship	State	Description
Unknown sailing vessels	Korean People's Army Naval Force	Korean War: A convoy of seven small sailing vessels were shelled and sunk by Gyeongju (Republic of Korea Navy).

=== 13 August ===
List of shipwrecks: 13 August 1950
Ship	State	Description
Mayakovsky	Soviet Union	The overloaded steamer sank in the Daugava River in Riga in the Soviet Union's Latvian Soviet Socialist Republic, killing 147 people.

=== 14 August ===
List of shipwrecks: 14 August 1950
Ship	State	Description
W. D. Duck	United Kingdom	The TID-class tug rna aground and sank in the River Dee. She was refloated on 23 August and taken in to Bromborough, Cheshire.
W. D. Teal	United Kingdom	The TID-class tug ran aground and sank in the River Dee. She was refloated on 11 September and towed in to Mostyn, Mostyn. Subsequently repaired and returned to service.

=== 15 August ===
List of shipwrecks: 15 August 1950
Ship	State	Description
Unidentified vessels	Korean People's Army Naval Force	Korean War: Fifteen small vessels were sunk by gunfire – and another 30 captured – by the minesweeper Gwangju (Republic of Korea Navy).

=== 20 August ===
List of shipwrecks: 20 August 1950
Ship	State	Description
Unidentified motorboat	Korean People's Army Naval Force	Korean War: The motorboat was sunk by gunfire by the minesweeper Gwangju (Republic of Korea Navy).

=== 22 August ===
List of shipwrecks: 22 August 1950
Ship	State	Description
Hazel I	United States	The 7-gross register ton 32.2-foot (9.8 m) fishing vessel was destroyed by fire between Point Francis and Helms Bay on the Cleveland Peninsula in Southeast Alaska.

=== 23 August ===
List of shipwrecks: 23 August 1950
Ship	State	Description
Jeep Hee	United Kingdom	The cargo ship struck a mine and sank in the Yangtze, China.

=== 24 August ===
List of shipwrecks: 24 August 1950
Ship	State	Description
Mahina Hou	United States	The 160-gross register ton, 103.6-foot (31.6 m) fishing vessel was wrecked just west of Cape Suckling (59°59′30″N 143°53′00″W) on the south-central coast of the Territory of Alaska.

=== 25 August ===
List of shipwrecks: 25 August 1950
Ship	State	Description
USS Benevolence	United States Navy	The hospital ship collided in fog with Mary Luckenbach (United States) off San Francisco, California and sank with the loss of 23 of her 505 crew.
Unknown motorboats	Korean People's Army Naval Force	Korean War: Two motorboats were shelled and sunk by Guwolsan (Republic of Korea Navy).
Unknown sailboat	Korean People's Army Naval Force	Korean War: One sailboat was shelled and sunk by Baekdusan (Republic of Korea Navy).
Unknown vessels	Korean People's Army Naval Force	Korean War: Three ships were shelled and sunk by Gilju (Republic of Korea Navy).

=== 31 August ===
List of shipwrecks: 31 August 1950
Ship	State	Description
Unknown motorboats	Korean People's Army Naval Force	Korean War: Two motorboats were shelled and sunk by Guemgamgsan (Republic of Korea Navy).

=== Unknown date ===
List of shipwrecks: Unknown date 1950
Ship	State	Description
Quebec	Canada	The cruise ship caught fire in the St. Lawrence River, a total loss.
Vermay	United States	The 50-ton 50-foot (15.2 m) wooden fishing vessel sank near Cape Muzon, Territory of Alaska.

== September ==
=== 3 September ===
List of shipwrecks: 3 September 1950
Ship	State	Description
Naughty Marletta	United States	The 12-gross register ton, 33.8-foot (10.3 m) fishing vessel was wrecked on a small island near the outer entrance to the eastern channel of Sitka Sound in the Alexander Archipelago in Southeast Alaska and sank.

=== 5 September ===
List of shipwrecks: 5 September 1950
Ship	State	Description
Empire Gladstone	United Kingdom	The cargo ship ran aground on the Haystack Rock, off the coast of New South Wales, Australia. She was on a voyage from Whyalla, South Australia to Sydney, New South Wales. She was a total loss.

=== 7 September ===
List of shipwrecks: 7 September 1950
Ship	State	Description
Basil	United States	The 28-gross register ton, 47-foot (14.3 m) motor vessel, a former landing craft mechanized, was wrecked on the beach at Cape Lisburne on the Chukchi Sea coast of the Territory of Alaska.

=== 10 September ===
List of shipwrecks: 10 September 1950
Ship	State	Description
Cameo	United Kingdom	The coaster was wrecked on the Mull of Galloway, Ayrshire. She was on a voyage from Port Talbot, Glamorgan to Dublin, Ireland.
Unidentified	Korean People's Army Naval Force	Korean War: The unidentified minelayer was shelled and sunk off Haeju, South Korea by ROKS Samgaksan (Republic of Korea Navy).

=== 12 September ===
List of shipwrecks: 12 September 1950
Ship	State	Description
Clan Chatton	United Kingdom	The cargo ship ran aground on the Shipwash Sands, 20 nautical miles (37 km) off Harwich, Essex.

=== 13 September ===
List of shipwrecks: 13 September 1950
Ship	State	Description
Three small boats	Korean People's Army Naval Force	Korean War: The submarine chaser ROKS Samgaksan (Republic of Korea Navy) sank the small boats with gunfire.

=== 15 September ===
List of shipwrecks: 15 September 1950
Ship	State	Description
Happy Harry	United Kingdom	The schooner foundered at Southport and was dismantled in situ.
Laplace	French Navy	The weather ship struck a mine and sank off Saint-Malo, Ille-et-Vilaine with the loss of at least 22 of her 92 crew. Twenty-nine were reported missing and 41 were rescued.
Libby, McNeill & Libby IX No. 16	United States	The 35-gross register ton, 59.9-foot (18.3 m) scow was destroyed by fire in George Inlet on the southern coast of Revillagigedo Island in the Alexander Archipelago in Southeast Alaska.

=== 16 September ===
List of shipwrecks: 16 September 1950
Ship	State	Description
Colonial	Portugal	The ocean liner was driven ashore on the Argyllshire coast in a storm. She was being towed from Lisbon, Portugal to the Clyde for scrapping and had a skeleton crew of eight on board. They were rescued by breeches buoy. The wreck was scrapped in situ.
La Place	French Navy	The Tacoma-class frigate struck a mine in the Baie de la Fresnaie off St Malo and sank with the loss of 51 of her 92 crew.

=== 21 September ===
List of shipwrecks: 21 September 1950
Ship	State	Description
P C #1	United States	The 94-gross register ton, 56-foot (17.1 m) scow sank in heavy seas off Cape Edward (57.6811°N 136.2550°W) on Herbert Graves Island (57.6828°N 136.1961°W) in Southeast Alaska.

=== 22 September ===
List of shipwrecks: 22 September 1950
Ship	State	Description
Energi	Sweden	The cargo ship struck a mine and sank off the Åland, Finland with the loss of eleven of her seventeen crew.

=== 25 September ===
List of shipwrecks: 25 September 1950
Ship	State	Description
Hyacinth	United States	The 33-gross register ton, 49.4-foot (15.1 m) motor cargo vessel was destroyed by fire in the anchorage at Katalla, Territory of Alaska.

=== 26 September ===
List of shipwrecks: 26 September 1950
Ship	State	Description
Juan de Fuca	United States	The Liberty ship was intercepted by Chinese Nationalist Navy warships 180 nautical miles (330 km) north of Keelung, Taiwan whilst being towed by the tug Margaret Moller (Hong Kong) from Hong Kong to Shanghai, China for scrapping. She was ordered to be cast adrift. No further trace, presumed foundered in the Formosa Strait.

=== 27 September ===
List of shipwrecks: 27 September 1950
Ship	State	Description
Liberté	France	The ocean liner ran aground in the Solent. Later refloated.

=== 28 September ===
List of shipwrecks: 27 September 1950
Ship	State	Description
Gapyeong	Republic of Korea Navy	Korean War: The Geumgagsan-class minesweeper was mined and sunk. 26 crewmen killed.

=== Unknown date ===
List of shipwrecks: Unknown date September 1950
Ship	State	Description
Breezin' Thru	United States	The pleasure yacht sank at Kingston, Jamaica, during a hurricane.

== October ==
=== 1 October ===
List of shipwrecks: 1 October 1950
Ship	State	Description
USS Magpie	United States Navy	Korean War: The YMS-1-class minesweeper struck a mine and sank off Chuksan, Korea with 21 crewmen missing, including her commanding officer. 12 survivors rescued by USS Merganser (United States Navy).

=== 5 October ===
List of shipwrecks: 5 October 1950
Ship	State	Description
Orwell	United Kingdom	The Thames barge collided with the motor barge Betty Hudson (United Kingdom) in the Thames Estuary and sank 36 nautical miles (67 km) downstream of London Bridge.

=== 11 October ===
List of shipwrecks: 11 October 1950
Ship	State	Description
Veron Mao	United States	The 10-gross register ton 33.5-foot (10.2 m) wooden pleasure craft sank in Cook Inlet in the Territory of Alaska.

=== 12 October ===
List of shipwrecks: 12 October 1950
Ship	State	Description
USS Pirate	United States Navy	Korean War: Operation Wonsan: The Admirable-class minesweeper struck a mine and sank off Sin-Do Island off Wonsan, Korea with 6 missing and 43 wounded. Survivors rescued by USS Incredible, USS Redhead, USS Kite, and USS Endicott (all United States Navy).
USS Pledge	United States Navy	Korean War: Operation Wonsan: The Admirable-class minesweeper struck a mine and sank off Sin-Do Island off Wonsan, Korea with one crewman killed and six missing. Survivors rescued by USS Incredible, USS Redhead, USS Kite, and USS Endicott (all United States Navy).

=== 15 October ===
List of shipwrecks: 15 October 1950
Ship	State	Description
Ernesto Tornquist	Argentina	The passenger ship ran aground on South Georgia. All 250 on board were rescued.
Lark	United States	The 17-gross register ton, 36.3-foot (11.1 m) fishing vessel was destroyed by fire in the Gulf of Alaska 12 nautical miles (22 km; 14 mi) south of Yakataga Beach (60°04′30″N 142°28′30″W) on the south-central coast of the Territory of Alaska.

=== 17 October ===
List of shipwrecks: 17 October 1950
Ship	State	Description
MS 14	Japan	Korean War: The minesweeper was sunk in Wonsan Bay by a mine. One killed, 15 wounded.

=== 18 October ===
List of shipwrecks: 18 October 1950
Ship	State	Description
Gonju	Republic of Korea Navy	Korean War: Operation Wonsan: The Geumgagsan-class minesweeper struck a mine and sank off Wonsan, Korea.
Ivercauld	United Kingdom	The 121.8-foot (37.1 m), 262-ton trawler was wrecked on rocks 1 mile (1.6 km) northwest of Skagi Lighthouse, Iceland. The vessel was declared a total loss and the crew were rescued.

=== 24 October ===
List of shipwrecks: 24 October 1950
Ship	State	Description
Alcantara	Panama	The cargo ship ran aground in the Scheldt and broke up. All crew rescued.

=== 26 October ===
List of shipwrecks: 26 October 1950
Ship	State	Description
Auchmacoy	United Kingdom	The tug was scuttled off Lagos, Nigeria.

=== 27 October ===
List of shipwrecks: 27 October 1950
Ship	State	Description
MS 30	Japan	Korean War: The minesweeper ran aground and sank off Korea.
Pierson Petroleum	United States	The 85-gross register ton, 59.5-foot (18.1 m) tanker scow sank off Naknek, Territory of Alaska.

== November ==
=== 7 November ===
List of shipwrecks: 7 November 1950
Ship	State	Description
Seniority	United Kingdom	The cargo ship ran aground at Leinish Point, Inner Hebrides. Sank the next day off Bo Vich Chuan Rock, Inner Hebrides.

=== 9 November ===
List of shipwrecks: 9 November 1950
Ship	State	Description
Tsze Hong	United Kingdom	The Saint-class tug foundered off Formosa.

=== 11 November ===
List of shipwrecks: 11 November 1950
Ship	State	Description
Masterman	United Kingdom	The tug struck Hogus Rocks, Cornwall. The tug Tradesman (United Kingdom) was damaged in assisting to free Masterman and had to be taken in tow by the tug Superman (United Kingdom).

=== 13 November ===
List of shipwrecks: 13 November 1950
Ship	State	Description
Ting Chu	Republic of China	Chinese Civil War: The N3-S-A1-class coastal cargo ship was shelled and sunk by People's Liberation Army artillery off Chiencow.

=== 15 November ===
List of shipwrecks: 15 November 1950
Ship	State	Description
Dixie	United States	The 10-gross register ton, 34.4-foot (10.5 m) fishing vessel was wrecked on rocks near Cape Bingham (57°55′00″N 136°33′30″W) on the north coast of Yakobi Island in the Alexander Archipelago in Southeast Alaska with the loss of two lives. The sole survivor clung to Yakobi Rock (58.0861°N 136.5606°W) for two days before local residents in a 32-foot (9.8 m) vessel rescued him on 17 November.
LT-636	United States Army	Korean War: The large tug was sunk by a mine off the coast of Wonsan. 22 Japanese onboard died.
Tini	United States	The Liberty ship was driven ashore near Cape Le Havre, Seine-Inférieure, France. She was refloated on 17 November.
Unknown transport	Japan	Korean War: The transport was sunk by a mine off Korea. 25 of 26 crew killed.

=== 17 November ===
List of shipwrecks: 17 November 1950
Ship	State	Description
Copper	United States	The 7-gross register ton, 31.9-foot (9.7 m) fishing vessel was destroyed by fire while docked at Seldovia, Territory of Alaska.
Skeldergate	United Kingdom	The cargo ship was driven ashore near Puri, India in a cyclone. She broke her back and was declared a total loss.

=== 24 November ===
List of shipwrecks: 24 November 1950
Ship	State	Description
Santagata	Italy	The cargo ship ran aground on the Goodwin Sands, Kent, United Kingdom. She subsequently broke in two and was a total loss. She was on a voyage from Casablanca, Morocco to Leith, Lothian, United Kingdom.

=== 26 November ===
List of shipwrecks: 26 November 1950
Ship	State	Description
Selnes	Norway	The cargo ship collided with City of Bristol (United Kingdom) in the Thames Estuary and was beached on the West Barrow Sands, where she was declared a total loss. Selnes was on a voyage from Oslo to London, United Kingdom.

=== 30 November ===
List of shipwrecks: 30 November 1950
Ship	State	Description
Esso Rochester	United States	The tanker broke in two off Anticosti Island, Quebec, Canada. She was on a voyage from Montreal, Quebec to Aruba, Netherlands Antilles. The bow section was towed to Mont-Joli, Quebec. It was subsequently taken in tow for Halifax, Nova Scotia but the tow was lost and it came ashore on Sea Wolf Island, Prince Edward Island and was a total loss. The stern section was towed to Sept-Îles, Quebec. It was towed to Newport News, Virginia in April 1951. A new bow section was built and she was returned to service.
Regent Lion	United Kingdom	The tanker ran aground in the Firth of Forth. Refloated the next day.

== December ==
=== 1 December ===
List of shipwrecks: 1 December 1950
Ship	State	Description
I P Suhr	Denmark	The collier capsized and sank in the Baltic Sea 5 nautical miles (9.3 km) off Sandhammaren, Sweden. The wreck was dispersed by explosives in 1952.

=== 2 December ===
List of shipwrecks: 2 December 1950
Ship	State	Description
Metamorfosis	Greece	The cargo ship ran aground at IJmuiden, North Holland, Netherlands and broke in two. She was a total loss.

=== 4 December ===
List of shipwrecks: 4 December 1950
Ship	State	Description
Yarmouth	Belgium	The 120.4-foot (36.7 m), 235-ton motor trawler was wrecked in a snowstorm on Scroby Sands, 3–4 miles (4.8–6.4 km) off Great Yarmouth. An attempt to refloat failed as did another sometime in 1951. The wreck was engulfed in sand in the Great Storm of 1953.

=== 7 December ===
List of shipwrecks: 7 December 1950
Ship	State	Description
Arctic Chief	United States	The 775-gross register ton, 149.7-foot (45.6 m) scow was wrecked in the Gulf of Alaska east of Marmot Island in the Territory of Alaska's Kodiak Archipelago.

=== 9 December ===
List of shipwrecks: 9 December 1950
Ship	State	Description
Northern Spray	United Kingdom	The 188.1-foot (57.3 m), 620-ton trawler dragged anchor in a fierce storm and went aground in the outer harbor of Ísafjörður, Iceland, later refloating and going aground again off the town. Pulled off on 25 December by ICGV Ægir (Icelandic Coast Guard), repaired and returned to service.

=== 11 December ===
List of shipwrecks: 11 December 1950
Ship	State	Description
Bechuana	South Africa	The Channel tanker ran aground at Port Nolloth, South Africa. A total loss. She was on a voyage from Port Nolloth to Cape Town.

=== 13 December ===
List of shipwrecks: 13 December 1950
Ship	State	Description
Jany Pierre	France	The fishing trawler sank off La Rochelle, Charente-Maritime with the loss of three of her seven crew. The other four were listed as missing.

=== 15 December ===
List of shipwrecks: 15 December 1950
Ship	State	Description
Etivebank	United Kingdom	The cargo ship ran aground at Licata, Italy after her anchor chain broke in heavy weather. Later refloated and returned to service.
Unknown	Republic of China Navy	Chinese Civil War: A convoy of five small Nationalist Chinese sailboats were sunk by No. 221 and No. 222 (both People's Liberation Army Navy) in the Zhoushan Islands. 70 crewmen and troops killed.

=== 18 December ===
List of shipwrecks: 18 December 1950
Ship	State	Description
Sachem	United States	The 71-foot (22 m) tugboat sank in 85 feet (26 m) of water in Lake Erie 59,000 feet (18,000 m) from Dunkirk Light, Dunkirk, New York in a snow storm. Lost with all 12 crew. The wreck was raised on 22 October 1951.

=== 23 December ===
List of shipwrecks: 23 December 1950
Ship	State	Description
Monte Negro	Spain	The cargo ship was wrecked at Tacloban, Philippines. She was on a voyage from Tacloban to Grangemouth, Stirlingshire, United Kingdom.
Santagata	Italy	The cargo ship ran aground on the Goodwin Sands, Kent, United Kingdom, and was wrecked. She broke in two and was declared a total loss. All 32 crew were rescued by the Walmer Lifeboat.

=== 31 December ===
List of shipwrecks: 31 December 1950
Ship	State	Description
Kostis Lemos	Greece	The Liberty ship was driven ashore on Camiguin Island, Philippines and broke in two, a total loss.

== Unknown date ==
List of shipwrecks: Unknown date 1950
Ship	State	Description
Albatros	Netherlands	The ship sank sometime in 1950 in an unknown location, probably in the Netherlands East Indies, in unknown conditions/circumstances.
ROCS Fang 3	Republic of China Navy	Chinese Civil War: The harbour defence motor launch was sunk.
ROCS Fang 8	Republic of China Navy	Chinese Civil War: The harbour defence motor launch was sunk.
James E. Longstreet	United States	The retired 7,176-gross register ton cargo ship — a Liberty ship — was run aground deliberately in Cape Cod Bay off Eastham, Massachusetts, at 41°49.7′N 070°11.2′W. Her wreck broke up and settled in 15 feet (4.6 m) of water.
ROKS Ka Pyong	Republic of Korea Navy	Korean War: The YMS-1-class coastal minesweeper was sunk.
ROKS Kong City	Republic of Korea Navy	Korean War: The BYMS-class coastal minesweeper was sunk.
Nelsine	United States	The 9-gross register ton, 33.9-foot (10.3 m) fishing vessel was wrecked on Homer Spit on the south-central coast of the Territory of Alaska.
Unidentified motor launches	Royal Egyptian Navy	Two Fairmile B motor launches sank c. 1949–1950.
USS YOGN-42	United States Navy	The concrete-hulled gasoline barge was beached and abandoned north coast of Lanai Territory of Hawaii, sometime in 1950 after being decommissioned in 1949.
