= List of Regis High School alumni =

This list of alumni of Regis High School (New York City) includes graduates and students who did not graduate.

- Vito Acconci (1940–2017) – performance artist and architect
- Norberto Barba (born 1963) – television and film director
- Adrian A. Basora (born 1938) – diplomat; U.S. ambassador to the Czech Republic (1993–95)
- Michael Bérubé (born 1961) – Edwin Erle Sparks Professor of Literature, Pennsylvania State University
- Adrian P. Burke (1904–2000) – lawyer, appellate judge (New York Court of Appeals), and politician.
- Kevin Burke – chairman, president, and CEO, Consolidated Edison
- James J. Busuttil (born 1958) – attorney, academic and human rights activist
- Frank Joseph Caggiano (born 1959) – bishop of Bridgeport (Connecticut)
- Thomas Cahill (born 1940) – scholar and writer; author, Hinges of History series
- Timothy Chorba (born 1946) – diplomat; U.S. ambassador to Singapore (1994–97)
- Bill Condon (born 1955) – director and Academy Award-winning screenwriter
- Edward Conlon (born 1965) – New York Police Department police officer; bestselling author
- John M. Corridan (1911–1984) – Jesuit priest; organized crime fighter on the New York City waterfront (inspiration for Fr. Barry in On the Waterfront)
- Declan Cronin (born 1997) – major league baseball player
- John D'Agostino – exchange markets expert; subject of Ben Mezrich's Rigged
- John D'Emilio (born 1948) – academic, historian, and activist
- Lou DiBella (born 1960) – boxing promoter
- Kieran Donohue – college basketball coach
- John Donvan (born 1955) – journalist; ABC News Nightline correspondent
- Max Esterson (born 2002) – racing driver
- Anthony Fauci (born 1940) – infectious diseases physician, HIV/AIDS researcher; head of the National Institute of Allergy and Infectious Diseases
- John D. Feeley (born 1961) – diplomat, U.S. ambassador to Panama (2016–18)
- Chuck Feeney (1931–2023) – businessman and philanthropist; did not graduate (attended for 1.5 years)
- Patrick Fitzgerald (born 1960) – U.S. attorney; Central Intelligence Agency leak investigation special prosecutor
- Steve Fuller – founder of social epistemology; professor at the University of Warwick, United Kingdom
- Greg Giraldo (1965–2010) – comedian and television personality
- Robert Giroux (1914–2008) – publisher, Harcourt, Brace & Company and Farrar, Straus and Giroux
- Frederick Gluck (born 1935) – managing director, McKinsey & Company (1988–1994)
- Pete Hamill (1935–2020) – writer and columnist; did not graduate (attended until age 16); awarded honorary diploma in 2010
- Charles Harbutt (1935–2015) – photographer
- Donald J. Harrington (born 1945) – former president, St. John's University; former president, Niagara University
- Andrew P. Harris (born 1957) – member of Congress
- Timothy S. Healy (1923–1992) – president, Georgetown University and the New York Public Library
- Rich Hickey – creator of the programming language Clojure
- Robert Hilferty – filmmaker, journalist, and HIV/AIDS activist
- Steve Hirdt – executive vice president, Elias Sports Bureau
- Colin Jost (born 1982), head writer and "Weekend Update" co-anchor, Saturday Night Live; stand-up comedian
- Brian P. Kavanagh (born 1967) – New York state senator
- John F. Keenan (1929-2024) – judge, U.S. District Court for the Southern District of New York
- Thomas C. Kelly (1931–2011) – archbishop, Roman Catholic Archdiocese of Louisville (Kentucky)
- Tom Kelly (1924–2008) – former Boston Celtics basketball player
- Phil Klay (born 1983) – winner, National Book Award for fiction in 2014 for Redeployment
- John Koeltl (born 1945) – judge, U.S. District Court for the Southern District of New York
- David Lat (born 1975) – founder and managing editor, Above the Law legal blog
- John Leo (born 1935) – author; former columnist, U.S. News & World Report
- Thomas Lippman (born 1939) – journalist and author; Middle East specialist
- Chris Lowney (born 1958) – Christian author and speaker
- Gerard E. Lynch (born 1951) – circuit judge, U.S. Court of Appeals for the Second Circuit
- John Maguire (1904–1989) – bishop, Roman Catholic Archdiocese of New York
- Eugene T. Maleska (1916–1993) – editor, New York Times crossword puzzle
- Robert Marasco (1936–1998) – playwright (Note: When Marasco's Child's Play premiered on Broadway in 1970, "he refused to reveal the name of his school because he thought that theatergoers would think the work was based on reality". He said the plot originated with a news story about a teacher's suicide and the Bergman film Torment.)
- Mark Mazzetti (born 1974) – Pulitzer Prize-winning New York Times writer
- Ken McCarthy (born 1959) – Internet commercialization pioneer, educator, activist
- Mac McGarry (1926–2013) – host, the Washington, D.C., and Charlottesville, Virginia, versions of the television student quiz show It's Academic
- John McGiver (1913–1975) – film and television character actor
- Dan McGrath (1964–2025) – television writer, writer for The Simpsons and King of the Hill
- Lawrence M. McKenna (1933–2023) – judge, U.S. District Court for the Southern District of New York
- Joseph M. McShane (born 1949) – president, Fordham University (2003–22)
- Ronald J. Mellor (born 1940) – scholar, ancient history and religion
- Arthur Minson Jr. (born 1970) – co-CEO, WeWork
- Alexander J. Motyl (born 1953) – political scientist, Rutgers University
- Thomas Francis Murphy (1906–1995) – government official in the perjury trials of Alger Hiss
- John Nonna (born 1948) – 1972 Summer Olympics fencer
- Frank S. Nugent (1908–1965) – New York Times film critic; screenwriter (The Quiet Man (1952), The Searchers (1956))
- Edward J. O'Donnell (1931–2009) – bishop, Roman Catholic Diocese of Lafayette (Louisiana)
- Joseph A. O'Hare (1931–2020) – president, Fordham University; chairman, New York City Campaign Finance Board; editor, America magazine
- John O'Keefe (born 1939) – Nobel laureate in Physiology or Medicine, 2014
- Francis Edward Peters (born 1927) – scholar of Middle East religion, New York University
- Patrick Quinlan – political activist and author
- Gerard Reedy (1939–2016) – president, College of the Holy Cross
- Ken Rosato – journalist; WABC-TV Eyewitness News anchor
- Sandro Santagata (born 1971) – clinical pathologist
- Lucy Sante (born 1954) – writer and critic; graduated as Luc Sante
- Jon Sciambi (born 1970) – sportscaster, ESPN
- Jim Sciutto (born 1970) – journalist; chief national security correspondent, CNN
- Buck Sexton (born 1981) – radio host
- Joe Sheehan – founding member, BaseballProspectus.com; sports writer
- William F. Smith (1901–1950) – lawyer; member, New York State Assembly
- Brian Thomsen (1959–2008) – science fiction writer
- Robert Tomasulo (1934–2008) – computer scientist; devised the Tomasulo algorithm named for him
- Pablo Torre (born 1985) – sportswriter, ESPN.com and ESPN The Magazine; panelist, ESPN shows, including Around the Horn
- Mike Walczewski (born 1956) – public address announcer, New York Knicks and Madison Square Garden
- William Braucher Wood (born 1950) – diplomat; U.S. ambassador to Colombia (2003–07) and Afghanistan (2007–09)
