= Santagata =

Santagata may refer to:

- Santagata (surname), list of people with the surname
- 22161 Santagata, an asteroid
- SS Santagata, a number of ships with this name
