= Thomas Wilson (shipping magnate) =

- Born: 1792
- Died: 1869 (aged 76–77)
- Occupations: Founder of the Wilson Shipping Line, of Cottingham & Kingston upon Hull
- Spouse: Susannah West
- Children: 13
- Parents: David Wilson; Elizabeth Gray

Thomas Wilson (1792–1869) was a 19th-century shipping magnate from Kingston upon Hull, England. In 1822, Wilson jointly founded Thomas Wilson Sons & Co., commonly known as the Wilson Line, a shipping company.

== Wilson Line ==
Thomas Wilson founded Beckington, Wilson and Company in 1822 as a joint venture with his partner John Beckington and two others. He did not come to the business with a background in shipping but through the use of ships for shipping of ore he quickly saw the potential opportunity and became a noted specialist shipowner. By 1825 he owned his first steam ship and saw the company become a prominent figure in promoting the Port of Hull to the third largest port in United Kingdom of Great Britain and Ireland during the emergence and rise of steam shipping in Britain.

In 1841, Thomas Wilson took full control of the company, after the other partners left, and so he brought his eldest son David into the business as his partner, making the name Thomas Wilson & Son Ltd. In 1850 his other sons Charles and Arthur joined and became active partners, the name changing to Thomas Wilson & Sons Co Ltd, though usually known as the Wilson Line of Hull.

Thomas died in 1869 and the company was taken over by Charles and Arthur, with David as silent partner. A few years later when they were beginning to question their own sons ability to continue running the firm, Charles and Arthur brought in a non-family member to become the new Managing Director, Oswald Sanderson. Parts of the company merged with the North Eastern Railway forming Wilson's & North Eastern Railway Shipping Co. Ltd; the majority was acquired in 1916 by Sir John Ellerman and renamed Ellerman's Wilson Line.

== Family ==
Thomas was the son of David Wilson (1745–1810) and Elizabeth (née Gray; born c. 1750). He married Susannah West (1796–1879), the daughter of John West and Grace Harrop, at Drypool, Yorkshire, on 1 September 1814. They had 13 children:

- David Wilson (1815–1893) – a bachelor, who managed the business with his father.
- John West Wilson (1816–1889) – became the Wilson line representative in Gothenburg, Sweden. He was a member of the Gothenburg City Council (1867–86); a board member of the Skandinaviska credit AB bank and a Director of the Gothenburg Museum.
- Edward Brown Wilson (1818–1874) – an engineer who became the manager of E. B. Wilson and Company, aka "The Railway Foundry", which produced the Jenny Lind, the first mass-produced locomotive.
- Thomas Wilson (1819–1901) MRCS – Surgeon and Homeopath.
- Susanna Wilson (1820–1902) – married Henry Garbutt, Captain HEICS.
- Elizabeth Gray Wilson (1822–1903) – married Edward Rheam Sanderson, the son of Joseph Sanderson, a shipping agent and merchant.
- Harriet West Wilson (1824–1879) – married William Eagle Bott, a ship-owner and broker.
- William Burton Wilson (1826–1874)
- Frederick Wilson (1830–1870)
- Rachel Wilson (1831–1911) – married Joseph Lambert, a corn merchant. He was the father of Rev. Joseph Malet Lambert
- Charles Wilson (1833–1907) – 1st Baron Nunburnholme married Florence Jane Helen Wellesley, granddaughter of Gerald Wellesley and a great-niece of Arthur Wellesley, 1st Duke of Wellington.
- Arthur Wilson (1836–1909) – see above, married Mary Emma Smith (1843–1927).
- Emily Howard Wilson (1836–1921) – married Arthur Harrison, a corn merchant.
