= Wilson's & North Eastern Railway Shipping Co =

Wilson's & North Eastern Railway Shipping Co. Ltd was formed in March 1906 in England by the family who controlled Wilson Line of Hull and the North Eastern Railway Company.

== History ==
=== Overview ===
At the beginning of the 20th century Wilson's were rapidly becoming one of the largest private shipping operations in the World and had further expanded by taking over the 23 ship fleet of another U.K. owner with similar North Sea operations. Through that takeover they had also acquired the agency for DFDS the leading Danish owner who also had services which either directly or indirectly competed with their own operation. At the same time the Wilson family were conscious of the need to maintain their relationship with the North Eastern Railway (N.E.R.) who were essential for the satisfactory movement of goods to and from the ports that Wilson's served, road haulage still being in its infancy, and who held operating rights over some of the same routes as themselves although they hadn't exercised those rights. The joint venture rationalised the Wilson services from the port of Hull and shipping interests of the N.E.R. whilst securing the vital rail access that the N.E.R. could provide.

Wilson's initially transferred five ships into the new operation in March 1906 : "Cito", "Dynamo", "Juno", "Bruno" and "Hero". Two further vessels "Otto" and "Truro" were added later.

The joint operation was further rationalised when it merged with three other operators to form the Associated Humber Lines in 1935 which brought together the services being operated by the railway companies through the ports of Hull, Grimsby and Goole in the River Humber.

=== Chronology ===
- 1903 – Thos. Wilson had taken over the 23 ship fleet of Bailey & Leetham which brought with it the agency for the United Steamship Company (DFDS) of Denmark. This agency presented problems for Wilson's as it overlapped some of their own activities and brought them into competition with railway shipping interests which were so vital in the operation of their existing business.
- 1905 – Wilsons sought a solution to the Hull services problem and a joint venture was proposed. The negotiations were led by Charles Wilson (Lord Nunburnholme) and his brother Arthur Wilson who was also a Director of the N.E.R.
- 1906 – Joint company formed in March to operate services from Hull. In the same year Thomas Wilson Sons & Co. took control of local shipbuilders Earle's Shipbuilding.
- 1923 – January – The company came under control of the London and North Eastern Railway.
- 1935 – May – the company was merged with other interests to form the Associated Humber Lines.
- 1957 – Final two ships "Selby" and "Harrogate" (1925) were sold and the company ceased to trade.

== Routes ==
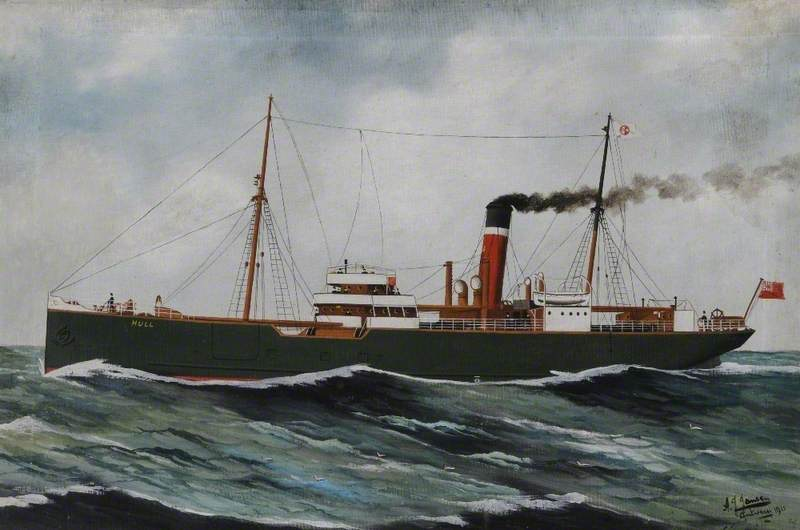
SS Hull

Hull to Hamburg; Antwerp / Ghent; and Dunkirk.

== Livery ==
Funnel : Red with black top with thin white dividing line.

Hull : Wilson dark green with red boot topping.

== Passenger / cargo vessels operated ==
Ship	Launched	Tonnage (GRT)	Notes and references
Dynamo	1884	594	Built by Earle's Shipbuilding for Thos. Wilson. Re-boilered in 1903. Scrapped in 1926.
Bruno	1892	841	Built by Earle's for Thos. Wilson. Sold in 1910 to Grand Trunk Pacific Development Company in Prince Rupert, British Columbia was renamed Prince Albert and operated from Prince Rupert – Vancouver – Victoria. The Grand Trunk became part of Canadian National Railways in 1920. The vessel changed hands within Vancouver in 1928, 1930 and again in 1938 being renamed J.R. Morgan in 1938 by the Badwater Towing Co. Sank in 1950 when owned by Tahsis Company when a cargo of logs shifted during a storm.
Hero	1895	775	Built by Earle's for Thos. Wilson. During World War I in 1916 she was transferred to the General Steam Navigation Co. (G.S.N.) in London. Chartered out to Ellerman Lines in 1923 but operated by Ellerman's Wilson Line. Reverted to G.S.N. in 1926 and finally scrapped in 1933.
Otto	1898	836	Built by Caledon Shipbuilding & Engineering Company in Dundee for Thos. Wilson. Broken up in Scotland in August 1935.
Truro	1898	836	Sister of Otto built for Thos. Wilson. Captured and then torpedoed in June 1915 whilst on passage from Christiania (Oslo) to Grimsby carrying timber.
Cito	1899	819	Built by Earle's for Thos. Wilson. Intercepted and sunk by gunfire from a German torpedo boat on 17 May 1917 with the loss of 11 lives.
Juno	1900	905	A sister of Cito, again built by Earle's. Broken up at Preston by Thos. Ward in 1926.
SS Hull	1907	1,132	Built by Caledon Shipbuilding & Engineering Company at Dundee. The first ship built for the new entity; her name was railway rather than Wilson and set a trend for the future. Ownership transferred to LNER in 1923 and joined AHL in 1935. Sold to Algerian interests and renamed Ville de Djidjelli in 1937 who converted her number 3 hold for wine carriage. Scrapped in 1955.
SS York	1907	1,132	A sister of Hull with similar history being renamed Ville de Bougie when also sold in 1937 with her sister. Withdrawn in 1956 when owners replaced her with a new ship of the same name.
SS Darlington	1910	1,076	Built by Earle's and launched the Hull – Antwerp route. Was in collision with Antwerp of the LNER in the River Scheldt and both vessel had to be beached to avoid sinking. Was surplus to requirements when AHL formed in 1935 and returned to Ellerman's Wilson Line as the Castro. Sold in 1937 to Stanhope SS Co. and renamed Stanrock to be used as a blockade runner in the Spanish Civil War. Sold again after one voyage and renamed Lydia. The vessel changed her name a further 3 times in 1938 and 1939 to Ocu, Hona and then Ilona and continued her blockade running operations. Sold into the Greek trades in 1940 and was seized by Germany in August of that year when Greece was conquered. Operated under German licence in Greek inter-island trades until April 1941 when bombed and sunk off Milos by an Allied aircraft.
SS Harrogate	1911	1,168	A sister to Darlington and entered service alongside her sister. However, on 20 February 1918, whilst on passage from Hull to Bergen with a cargo of coke, she foundered and sank in a storm, off the Norwegian coast.
SS Selby	1922	1,039	Built by J. Duthie Torry SB Co., of Aberdeen. Transferred to LNER in 1923 and joined AHL. in 1935. Scrapped at Odense in 1958.
SS Harrogate	1925	1,029	A sister of Selby except built at Leith by Ramage & Ferguson Ltd. Delivered for Hull-Hamburg route but also served Rotterdam and Antwerp when traffic required. Scrapped in 1958.

== Bibliography ==
- Greenway, Ambrose (1986). A Century of North Sea Passenger Steamers. Shepperton: Ian Allan. ISBN 0-7110-1338-1.
- Haws, Duncan (1993). Merchant Fleets-Britain's Railway Steamers-Eastern & North Western Companies + Zeeland and Stena. Hereford: TCL Publications. ISBN 0-946378-22-3.
