= Robert W. Langwell =

American military personnel

Robert Warren Langwell
- Born: July 30, 1924; Columbus, Bartholomew County, Indiana
- Disappeared: October 1, 1950; Chusan Po, Korea
- Body discovered: April 28, 2009
- Resting place: Arlington National Cemetery; 38.8769°N 77.0708°W (approximate)
- Relatives: Arthur James Langwell; Edna Irene Parker Langwell

United States Navy Ensign Robert Warren Langwell, of Columbus, Indiana was declared missing in action during the Korean War. His body was recovered in 2008 by the Republic of Korea's Ministry of National Defense Agency for Killed in Action Recovery and Identification (MAKRI) who which sent them to Joint POW/MIA Accounting Command (JPAC) for analysis. Among other forensic identification tools and circumstantial evidence, JPAC scientists used dental comparisons in the identification of Langwell's remains, which were buried with full military honors in Arlington National Cemetery on July 12, 2010.

== Disappearance and aftermath ==
On October 1, 1950, Langwell was serving on the minesweeper USS Magpie (AMS-25) when it struck an enemy mine off the coast of Chuksan-ri, South Korea. While twelve crew members of Magpie were rescued, Langwell was one of 20 others lost at sea.

Personnel from MAKRI canvassed towns in South Korea in an effort to gather information regarding South Korean soldiers who remain unaccounted-for from the Korean War. An elderly fisherman in the village of Chuksan-ri reported that he and other villagers buried an American service man in 1950 when his body was caught in the man's fishing net. MAKRI personnel located the burial site April 28, 2009, where they excavated human remains and military artifacts. The burial site was approximately three miles west of where Magpie sank in 1950.

== See also ==
- List of people who disappeared mysteriously at sea
