= Santagata (surname) =

Santagata is a surname which was derived from Saint Agatha known as Agatha of Sicily. It has origins from Caserta and Naples. Notable people with the surname include:

- Giulio Santagata (1949–2024), Italian politician
- Marco Santagata (1947−2020), Italian academic, writer, and literary critic
- Sandro Santagata, American physician and academic

== Stage name ==
- Toni Santagata, stage name of Antonio Morese (1935–2021), Italian folk singer
