= Oswald Sanderson =

English businessman

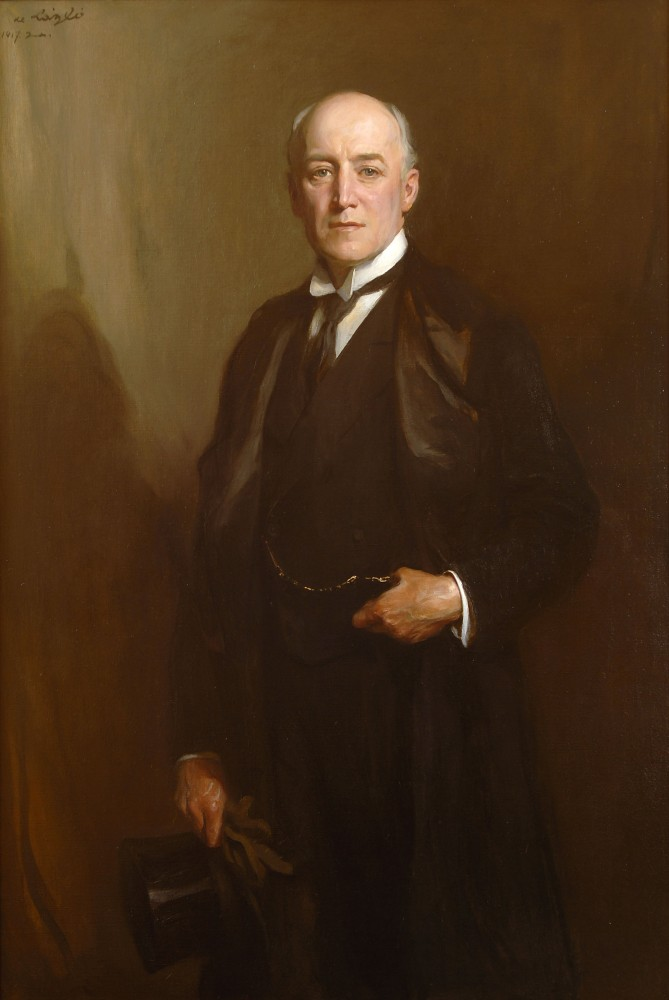
Portrait by Philip de László, 1917

Oswald Sanderson (3 January 1863 – 25 December 1926) was an English businessman, best known for his involvement in the Wilson Line of Hull and later the Ellerman Wilson Line.

== Early life ==
Sanderson was born on 3 January 1863 in Oxton, Cheshire the son of Richard Sanderson a general merchant. He was educated at King's Ely.

== Shipping ==
He started work at the offices of the Wilson Line in Hull, his father was an agent for the company in New York. After he gained some experience at Hull he joined his father in New York. He returned to Hull in 1901 at the request of Charles and Arthur Wilson to become Managing Director at Thomas Wilson Sons & Co. until its sale to Ellerman Lines in 1916 where he continued as Managing director of the combined Ellerman Wilson Line until he died.

== Military and civil service ==
During the First World War Sanderson was appointed honorary colonel of the 2nd Northumbrian Brigade, Royal Field Artillery on 8 August 1914.

On 1 September 1916, he was appointed a temporary major in the 1st Volunteer Battalion, East Yorkshire Regiment, and became honorary commandant of the regiment, as an honorary lieutenant-colonel, on 1 September 1918.

He was again appointed to a temporary majority in the battalion, with the precedence of his previous appointment, on 13 January 1919. On 28 June 1919, he was appointed a deputy lieutenant of the East Riding of Yorkshire.

== Family life ==
Sanderson married Beatrice Marion Fitch Beddal and they had three sons and a daughter. He died on 25 December 1926 aged 63 in a Nursing Home in Leeds following an operation.
