= SS Santagata =

A number of steamships have been named Santagata. including –

- SS Santagata (1905), an Italian cargo ship in service 1935–43
- SS Santagata (1943), an Italian cargo ship in service 1949, later MV Santagata

(1950)

- SS Sant’Agata (1917), an Italian sailing ship in service
