= SS Bayardo =

British Cargo Ship

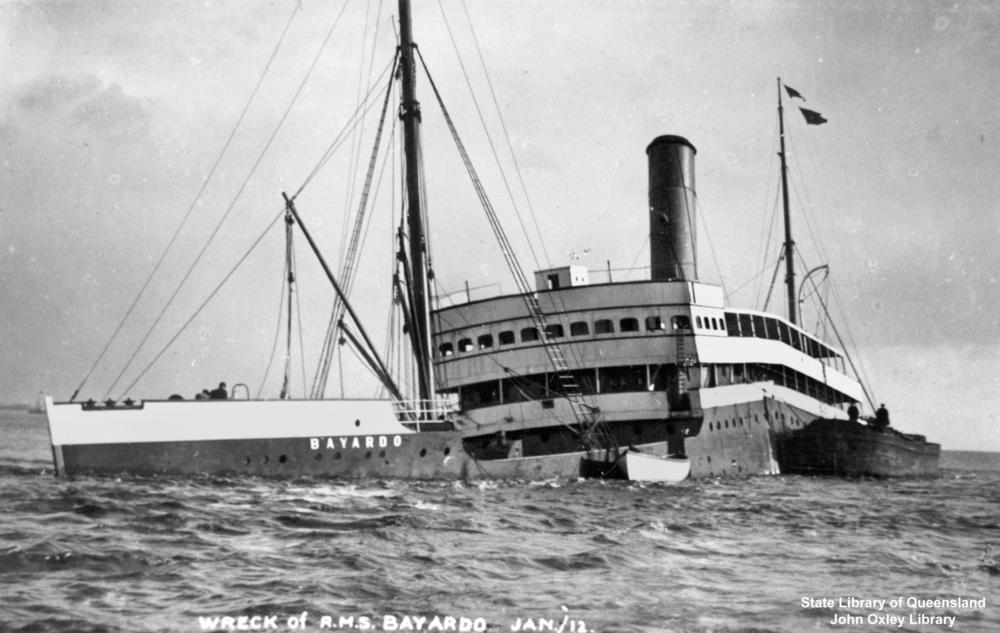
- Bayardo wrecked on the Middle Sand.

History
- Name: (United Kingdom of Great Britain and Ireland) Bayardo
- Owner: Thomas Wilson Sons & Co.
- Port of registry: (United Kingdom of Great Britain and Ireland) Hull, United Kingdom
- Route: Gothenburg - Hull
- Builder: Earle's Shipbuilding & Engineering Co.
- Yard number: 576
- Launched: 29 May 1911
- Completed: 1911
- Acquired: 1911
- In service: 1911–1912
- Out of service: 21 January 1912
- Identification: Official number: 132256
- Fate: Ran aground and wrecked on 21 January 1912 on the Middle Sand in the Humber.

General characteristics
- Type: Refrigerated Cargo Ship
- Tonnage: 3,471 GRT
- Length: 100.9 metres (331 ft 0 in)
- Beam: 14.3 metres (46 ft 11 in)
- Depth: 8.2 metres (26 ft 11 in)
- Installed power: 1 x 3-cyl. triple expansion engine, 3 boilers
- Propulsion: One screw propeller
- Speed: 15 knots
- Notes: Nicknamed The Queen of the Fleet for the Wilson Line.

SS Bayardo was a British refrigerated cargo ship that ran aground and was wrecked on the Middle Sand in the Humber Estuary, near Hull, United Kingdom on 21 January 1912 while she was travelling from Gothenburg, Sweden to Hull, United Kingdom carrying general cargo.

== Construction ==
Bayardo was built and completed in 1911 at the Earle's Shipbuilding & Engineering Co. shipyard in Hull, United Kingdom. The ship was 100.9 metres (331 ft 0 in) long, had a beam of 14.3 metres (46 ft 11 in) and had a depth of 8.2 metres (26 ft 11 in). She was assessed at 3,471 GRT and had a single 3-cyl. triple expansion engine driving a screw propeller as well as 3 boilers and a single smoke stack. The ship had a speed of 15 knots (28 km/h; 17 mph).

== Grounding And Loss ==
Bayardo entered the Humber Estuary as part of the last leg of her voyage from Gothenburg, Sweden to Hull, United Kingdom on 21 January 1912 while carrying general cargo. The ship had already sailed this route on 12 other occasions, however on this day as the ship approached Hull, a dense fog limited visibility. Bayardo ran aground on the Middle Sand in the fog, opposite Alexander Dock in the Humber. Nobody was killed or injured in the incident and all passengers were safely evacuated to the shore. In an attempt to refloat her, many fittings were removed, but the strong tide had pushed the ship further onto the sandbank. When the tide ultimately fell the ship broke her back, so was deemed a total loss.

== Wreck ==
The wreck of Bayardo began to quickly break apart due to the waves crashing into her superstructure, and mostly sank into the mud of the riverbed, leaving only a part of the ship still exposed above the surface. By that point, most of her cargo had already been salvaged. After determining that the wreck posed a navigational hazard, Bayardo's remains were blown up and dispersed.
