= USS Redhead =

USS Redhead is a name used more than once by the United States Navy:

- USS Redhead (AMS-34), a coastal minesweeper commissioned 15 December 1944.
- USS Redhead (AM-409), a minesweeper, which was canceled 11 August 1945.
