= Thomas Wilson Sons & Co. =

Former British shipping company

- Industry: Shipping
- Predecessors: Beckington, Wilson and Company (1822–1836); Wilson, Hudson and Company (1836–1840); Thomas Wilson and Company (1840–1850)
- Founded: 1840; 186 years ago in England
- Defunct: 1916; 110 years ago
- Fate: Sold
- Successor: Ellerman's Wilson Line

Thomas Wilson Sons & Co. was a British shipping company, founded in 1840, It evolved from a joint venture formed by merchants Thomas Wilson, John Beckinton and two unrelated partners named Hudson in 1822.

The company expanded and by the early 20th century operated a relatively large fleet, but in 1906 part of the operation was merged with the North Eastern Railway creating Wilson's & North Eastern Railway Shipping Co. Ltd and later in 1916 the remaining company was sold to Sir John Ellerman who created Ellerman's Wilson Line which continued to trade until closed in 1973.

== Background ==
1822–1836 Beckington, Wilson and Company

None of the partners came from shipping background but were quick to see the opportunity of becoming involved in the industry and they acquired their first sailing ship the "Thomas and Ann" in 1825, and a schooner "Swift" in 1831.

1836–1840 Wilson, Hudson and Company

In about 1836 John Beckington dropped out of the partnership and the new company was formed.

== History ==
1840–1850 Thomas Wilson and Company

House flag of the Thomas Wilson Sons and Company (1840-1916)

The two Hudson partners retired in 1840–41 allowing Thomas Wilson to take full control. He brought his eldest son David into the business as his partner.

1850–1916 Thomas Wilson Sons and Company
(became a Limited company in 1891)

In 1850 his other sons Charles and Arthur joined and became active partners, the name changing to Thomas Wilson Sons and Company, though usually known as the Wilson Line of Hull.

Thomas died in 1869 and the company was taken over by his sons Charles and Arthur Wilson, with David remaining a silent partner. A few years later the brothers were beginning to question the ability of their own sons to continue running the firm and brought in a non-family member, Oswald Sanderson, to become the new Managing Director.

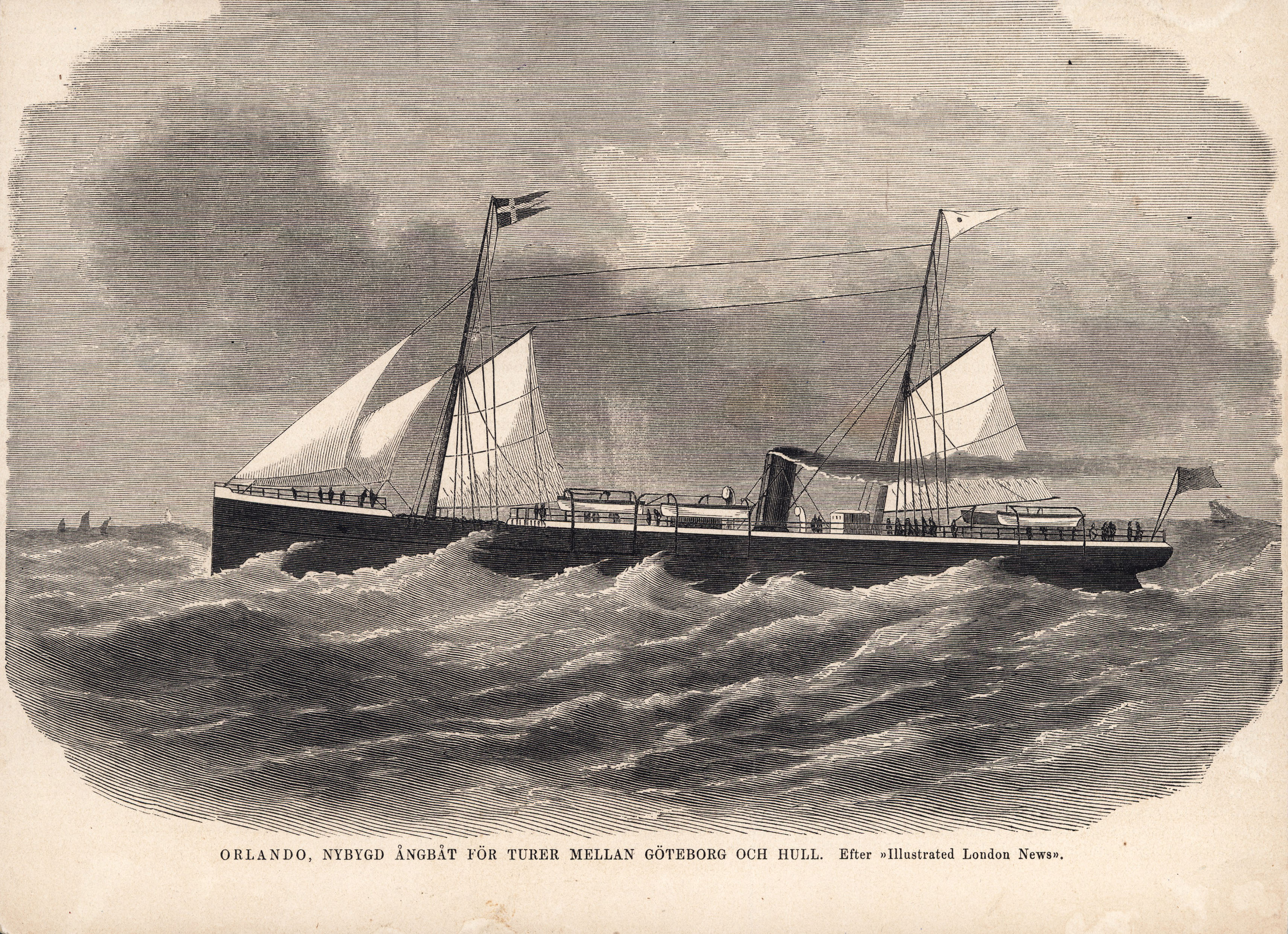
Orlando at sea around 1870

In 1878 the company purchased the seven ship fleet of Brownlow Marsdin and Co., bringing the Wilson fleet to 52 ships.

In 1903 23 ships were purchased from Bailey & Leetham.

In 1906 part of the operation was merged with the North Eastern Railway creating Wilson's & North Eastern Railway Shipping Co. Ltd.

In 1906 the company purchased the shares in the ailing local firm Earle's Shipbuilding and ordered ships from them.

1916–1973 Ellerman's Wilson Line

House flag of the Ellerman's Wilson Line (1916–1973)

The company was sold to Sir John Ellerman in 1916, owner of the successful Ellerman Line and supposedly the richest man in Britain at the time. There can be little doubt that the loss of three of its largest and most prestigious ships to enemy action (Aaro and Calypso sunk; Eskimo captured) in a three-week period in the summer contributed greatly to the Wilson family's decision to sell the company. Though it kept the Wilson name (Ellerman's Wilson Line of Hull) and continued for several years, it never saw the same success, despite a brief revival in the 1950s, and was eventually closed in 1973 when the Ellerman company turned its focus elsewhere.

=== Development ===
From a background in iron importing, the focus was on steam shipping, still in its early stages and eventually saw the company become a prominent figure in modern steam shipping. Initially, the firm concentrated on Swedish iron ore importing for the Sheffield iron trades but gradually turned to focus on shipping all over the world, with Hull becoming one of the most significant ports to flourish under the advent of steam. Previously getting out of the Humber Estuary was difficult despite the convenient location of Hull, but with steam, it became easy to reach the sea and navigate around Britain.

=== Relevance ===
At one time the firm was well on its way to becoming the world's largest private shipowner. The company stands out as one of interest in the maritime and business world of the period, as it provides an example of the changing fortunes of a family business. It has been suggested that Thomas Wilson is a good example of the emergence of specialist shipowners at this time.

=== Livery ===
Funnels: Red with black top.

Hull: black (Thomas Wilson Sons) or dark green (Ellerman's Wilson) but occasionally white where the vessel had refrigerated capacity.

== Passenger vessels of Thomas Wilson Sons & Co. / Ellerman's Wilson Line ==
Ship	Launched	Tonnage (GRT)	Notes and references
Tasso	1852	610	Built by Denny and launched as Scandinavian but renamed Tasso in 1870. Lost at Bergen in 1885.
Hero	1861	985	Hero was 224.3 ft (68.4 m) x 29.2 ft (8.9 m) x 15.7 ft (4.8 m), 150 hp (110 kW), 3-masted screw steamer, launched in March 1861 by Earle's Shipbuilding for the Scandinavia/Baltic service. She was a sold for use by the Confederate States of America, to run the blockade between Nassau and Charleston, until she ran aground on 23 June 1862, near Fort Moultrie. She probably ran the blockade to Charleston again, before Black Ball Line, Liverpool bought her in 1863. She was sold to Bright Bros, arriving at Melbourne, via Cape Town on 18 September 1863, after leaving Liverpool on 22 July, the wheel having been broken and cabins inundated by a cyclone on the way. Her 2 engines used 17 tons of coal a day to run at 11.5 knots (21.3 km/h; 13.2 mph). Her saloon was described as somewhat superior, very capacious, well ventilated and accommodating about 40 passengers. In 1873 she was sold to Grice, Sumner & Co, Melbourne and in 1878 to the Union Company for the Auckland-Sydney route. She was laid up at Sydney until 1891, when she went to La Societe Le Nickel, Nouméa for use as a hulk. She was wrecked in a hurricane at Kouaoua on 22 January 1901.
Hero	1866	1,034	The second Hero was 229.3 ft (69.9 m) x 30.6 ft (9.3 m) x 20.8 ft (6.3 m), schooner rigged, single screw, launched in February 1866 by Earle's Shipbuilding for Wilson Line, with 2 decks, 2 bulkheads and 3 partial bulkheads and 180 hp (130 kW) 4-cylinder (2 x 27in, 47in, stroke 30in) compound engines from 1873 by C. D. Holmes, Hull. From 1876 to 1881 she ran from Hull to Oslo and Kristiansand, then operated on the Hull–Trondheim service, with Tasso until 1884. From 1889 she was joined by Cameo. Hero remained on the route until 1892. She was scrapped at Hull after a collision in the English Channel on 22 June 1895, which sank Lamport & Holt's Bessell.
Rollo	1870		Built by Earle's Shipbuilding for Gothenburg service
Orlando	1870		Probably a sister of Rollo built by Earle's for Gothenburg service.
Eldorado	1873	3,300	Built for Wilson's Indian service.
Romeo	1880	1,840	Built by Earle's Shipbuilding for Hull–Gothenburg service. Transferred to London–Riga service in about 1904 and operated alongside Bailey & Leetham's Jaffa and Zara until the outbreak of the First World War. Lost along with 26 of her 29 crew, following a torpedo attack by U-102, in the Mull of Galloway on 3 March 1918.
Juno	1882	1,302	Built by Earle's mainly for Hull–Hamburg service. Sold in 1888 to Tyne Steam Shipping Co., and joined newly amalgamated Tyne Tees Steam Shipping Company in 1904, retaining her name and trading generally to Hamburg. At the outbreak of the First World War she was unlucky to be in Hamburg and was detained by the German authorities. She was abandoned by her owners to the North of England P & I Club. After the war ended in 1918 she was returned to the UK where she was sold to Portuguese interests and renamed Afra followed by Leca. She was sold again to the US Shipping Board and allocated to James R. Armstrong of Colon being renamed El Amigo. After 2 further years she was sold on again to Hammond Oil Co., and registered at Tampico, Mexico. Between 1926 and when finally broken up in 1935 she was renamed Edith F and Cecilia as she changed hands a further three times.
Eldorado	1885	935	Built by Earle's for the Hull to Bergen service and exclusively for passengers. Sold after less than a year in 1886 to the Greek government and renamed Sfaktirea and used as a naval auxiliary until returned to commercial service about 20 years later as the Mykali. Changed hands several times within the Greek shipping industry being renamed Mykali Togia before finally being scrapped in Italy after a 49-year career in 1933.
Eldorado	1886	1,382; 1,425	Built by Earle's Shipbuilding as a replacement for the earlier vessel of same name on Hull to Stavanger & Bergen route. She undertook occasional cruises during the winter off-season, and in January 1890 her itinerary took her from Hull to Madeira, Nice, Malta, Constantinople and Odessa returning home in early April. She was lengthened in 1895. Transferred to Grimsby–Gothenburg route in 1911, and was withdrawn from service to become a cadet training ship and was moored in Hull's Railway Dock very close to Wilson's head office. Found to be unsound in 1913 she was sold for scrapping in Newport in. A new shore based training school known as RMS Eldorado was established in her memory.
Juno	1889	1,080	Built by Earle's mainly for use on Hull–Trondheim route with the Hero. Sold in 1899 to Bergen Line who employed her on their Hamburg–Kristiansand–Vadsø service having renamed her Hera. In 1910 she was switched to their coastal service from Bergen to Vadso until March 1931, in her 42nd year of service, when she ran aground and was wrecked in a storm off the Norwegian coast. Six lives were lost but thanks to the extreme gallantry of crewman Einar Ramm, 56 people were saved.
Ariosto	1889	2,376	Built by Earle's Shipbuilding for the Hull–Gothenburg service and was the largest North Sea passenger vessel of her day. Romeo was her running mate on the service which carried large numbers of emigrants on what was the first leg of the journey to the New World. The Romeo was replaced by the new Calypso in 1904. Ariosto was withdrawn from Wilson service in 1910 after an uneventful career She was sold to Spanish owners La Roda Hermanos of Valencia and renamed Luis Vives. She was lost to a torpedo attack by UB-18 off the Scilly Islands on 11 September 1916.
Tasso	1890	1,328	Built by Earle's Shipbuilding for the Trondheim route. Lengthened in 1899 and later switched to Hull–Bergen service. She was badly damaged in a collision in poor visibility with 18,000 ton Hamburg America Line ship President Lincoln in January 1911 and escorted to Dover by the liner. Following repair she was sold to W. Morphy and Son of Hull and changed hands again before the First World War when sold to Greek interests and renamed Elefsis. She was lost on passage between Corsica and Elba on Christmas Day 1920 by which time she was named Photios.
Montebello	1890	1,735	Built by Richardson, Duck and Company, at Stockton-on-Tees for the Kristiansand and Oslo service. She became surplus to requirements in 1910 and sold to Spain's Compania Valenciana and renamed Barcelo, operating between Spanish ports and the Canary Islands. Her owner was absorbed into Compania Transmediterranea in 1917 and she served this company as Barcelo until scrapped in 1929.
Spero	1896	1,132	Built by Archibald MacMillan & Co at Dumbarton. She was utilised on various services mainly on the emigrant traffic and made numerous calls to Stettin. Before the First World War worked Hull–Oslo as a supplementary or relief vessel. She was a war loss when sunk by U-69 submarine on 2 November 1916. Survivors were rescued by USS Emeline.
Zero	1896	1,143	Near sister of Spero although built at Earle's in Hull. She served with Spero in the emigrant trade until switched to Copenhagen route before the First World War. Requisitioned as a frozen meat ship but rejected as unsuitable after only a few days. Operated in a 'cargo only' service after the war until 1931 when she was laid up at the end of that year and was broken up at Grangemouth the following year.
Salmo	1897	1,721	Built by Caledon Shipbuilding & Engineering Company in Dundee at a time when Earle's were experiencing considerable difficulties. One of seven vessels built by that yard at the time for the Line of which only Salmo was for passenger service. She mainly served Bergen and Stavanger until 1911 when she switched to a secondary Grimsby–Kristiansand / Oslo service. Just before the First World War she moved to a Grimsby–Gothenburg service. In wartime she served in coastal traffic and was torpedoed by U-60 and lost off Fastnet Rock on 7 April 1917.
Una	1899	1,406	Built by John Scott & Co at Kinghorn for Hull shipowner Bailey & Leetham, who had been taken over by Thomas Wilson in 1903. Under Wilson ownership she traded mainly from Hull or Newcastle upon Tyne to Copenhagen in a joint service with DFDS. Sold to Jose Maria Maycas, La Roda Hermanos and others in 1909 and renamed Vicente La Roda. Her owners became Compania Valenciana, who were later absorbed into Compania Transmediterranea in 1917. She was sunk during the Spanish Civil War but later raised and rebuilt in 1945 becoming the Juan Illueca for new owners Enrique Illueca. Her career continued until June 1960 when this remarkable ship became wrecked on Cape Penas whilst on passage from Bordeaux to Gijón, 61 years after her launching.
Calypso	1904	2,876	Built by Earle's Shipbuilding and was largest North Sea passenger vessel of her day. She was the first two-funnelled vessel in the owner’s short sea fleet. She entered the Hull–Gothenburg service. In 1914 she was converted by the Admiralty to an armed merchant cruiser and renamed HMS Calyx to avoid confusion with an existing HMS Calypso. She was employed on northern patrols but was found to be too small for the high seas often encountered and was returned to ferry services between London, Kristiansand and Oslo. However she was torpedoed and sunk by U-53 on 11 July 1916.
Oslo	1906	2,296	Built by Earle's Shipbuilding and notable for her name as the Norwegian capital only adopted that name in 1927. Entered service to Oslo transferring to the Bergen/Trondheim route in 1910 and continued to trade the Norwegian routes during the First World War. Having survived one attack in October 1915 outrunning her assailant, she was lost to a torpedo attack by U-87 off Shetland on 21 August 1917.
Aaro	1909	2,603	Built by Earle's and was the first of the regular Humber ferries to have a W/T aerial fitted between her two very tall masts. Entered Oslo service but switched to the Bergen/Trondheim route in 1911. In January of that year the vessel collided with the Norwegian registered Richard (1,082 grt), whilst entering the Humber Estuary, sinking the vessel, but all on board were rescued by the Aaro which continued relatively undamaged into Hull. On 1 August 1916 she was torpedoed and sunk by U-20 SW off Stavanger with the loss of 3 lives and the remainder of the crew were taken captive. This was the third loss the Line had suffered within a three-week period and there is little doubt that these losses contributed greatly to the Wilson family's decision to sell out to Ellerman.
Eskimo	1910	3,326	Built by Earle's for the Oslo service and was quite unlike any other vessel built for the line before her. Achieved an average speed of 17.3 knots on trial thus becoming the line's fastest vessel by a considerable margin. Requisitioned by the Admiralty in November 1914 she was fitted out as an armed merchant cruiser, but like the Calypso before her, was found to be too small for the Atlantic in all weathers and was returned to her owners in July 1915 and resumed her North Sea services. In July 1916 she was captured by a German auxiliary cruiser south of Arendal and became a netlayer under German naval control, returning to Ellerman Wilson after the war ended. The company had no further use for her and she was sold to French interests in 1921, trading as a cargo ship under the same name between Southern France and North Africa until 1930 when she was sold for scrap.
Bayardo	1911	3,570	Built by Earle's for the Gothenburg service. Very similar to the Eskimo (1910) in general design but was slightly larger with only one funnel. Her slightly larger size afforded her the title 'The Queen of the Fleet'. Her reign was sadly cut short after only seven months when she grounded whilst creeping up a fog-shrouded Humber Estuary in January 1912. The strength of the tide pushed her partially onto a bank and as the tide fell she broke her back and became a total loss. All on board were rescued, and much of the cargo and expensive fittings were salved. The hulk quickly began to break up and sink in the mud and she was finally blown up being a hazard to navigation.
Rollo	1899	3,658	Acquired in 1920 to replace war losses. Built by Barclay Curle in Glasgow as the Fantee for the Elder Dempster Lines managed African Steamship Company's West African trade. Sold in 1915 to Ellerman & Papayanni and renamed Italian before being transferred to Ellerman's Wilson Line and renamed Rollo in 1920. Mainly employed on the Hull–Gothenburg service but later also included Oslo and occasionally Danzig. Changes in U.S. immigration quotas in 1923 reduced the level of carryings in this trade and the vessel was laid up in July 1928 being eventually sold to Danish shipbreakers in 1932.
Orlando	1904	4,233	The second vessel acquired in 1920 to replace war losses. Built in Aberdeen by Hall Russell & Company for the Harrison / John T. Rennie service from the U.K. to Natal. Employed initially in the Hull–Danzig service before transferring to the London / Hull – Gothenburg / Oslo routes. In the winter of 1927/8 she performed a round voyage for Ellerman & Bucknall to South Africa. Withdrawn from service in 1929, she was laid up until sold for breaking up at Briton Ferry by Thos. W. Ward in July 1932.
Calypso	1897	3,817	The third vessel acquired in 1920 to replace war losses. Built by Sir Raylton Dixon in Middlesbrough and entered service as the Bruxellesville between Antwerp and the Congo for the Woermann controlled Soc. Maritime du Congo. In 1901 she was transferred to full Woermann ownership, renamed Alexandra Woermann and entered the Hamburg to German West Africa trade. During the First World War she served the German Navy as a transport vessel and was surrendered to the U.K. Shipping Controller in March 1919 and placed under White Star Line management. Purchased by Ellerman's Wilson in November 1920 and renamed Calypso in memory of the vessel lost during the war. Early in her new career she performed round trips to India but then settled on the Oslo, Gothenburg and Danzig services, and later became a summer-only vessel on the Hull–Oslo service, laying up in winter at Hull. In 1933 she started a series of cruises out of London to Copenhagen and return, via Kristiansand, which continued until 1936 when she was withdrawn and sold for scrapping in Bruges by Van Heyghen Freres. The success of her cruises were mirrored by cruises from Hull to Norway by other Ellerman Lines vessels transferred from the group companies. The City of Canterbury in 1933, the City of Paris in 1934 and 1935 and the City of Nagpur from 1936 until 1939.
Spero	1922	1,589	Built by the Dundee Shipbuilding Company at a time when shipbuilding capacity was fully stretched. The vessel was initially used on the Oslo service but entered the long established joint service with DFDS for which she had been built between Hull and Copenhagen alternating with their Hroar during 1923. She survived the Second World War, during which she mainly operated coastal duties and returned to the Copenhagen service in 1946 but was confined to relief duties as she neared the end of her working life. Finally withdrawn and laid up in October 1958. She was sold to breakers in Antwerp the following year.
Bravo	1947	1,798	Built by Henry Robb of Leith.
Borodino	1950	3,206	Built by Ailsa Shipbuilding Company of Troon she was the last conventional passenger/cargo vessel in the Wilson fleet. Entered service from Hull to Copenhagen and Aarhus in the joint service with DFDS and switched in 1965 to the similar service out of London. Mini cruises on the round voyage became very popular but the increasing competition from the faster North Sea ferries gradually reduced her passenger carryings resulting in her being withdrawn at the end of 1966 and eventually sold for scrapping in Bruges in mid-1967 when no buyer for further trading could be found.
Spero	1966	6,916	Built by Cammell Laird at Birkenhead for the Hull–Gothenburg service but spent part of 1966 also serving London. A fine traditional looking car ferry which relatively quickly became dated by the new drive through vessels being introduced by competitors. In 1972 switched to Hull – Zeebrugge and in April 1973 was sold to Maritime Company of Lesvos in Greece and renamed Sappho entering service on their Lesvos – Piraeus service in June 1973. The vessel changed hands becoming the Santorini 3 and finally the Santorini before being sold for scrapping at Alang, India arriving there in January 2004.

== See also ==
- Earle's Shipbuilding
- John Ellerman
- Oswald Sanderson
- Thomas Wilson
- Wilson's & North Eastern Railway Shipping Co. Ltd

== Bibliography ==
- Credland, Arthur G.; Thompson, Michael (1994), The Wilson Line of Hull 1831–1981: The Rise and Fall of an Empire, Cherry Burton, UK: Hutton Press Ltd, ISBN 978-1-872167-58-9
- Credland, Arthur G. (2000), The Wilson Line (Archive Photographs: Images of England), Stroud, UK: The History Press LTD, ISBN 978-0-7524-1728-8
- Greenway, Ambrose (1986); A Century of North Sea Passenger Steamers; Shepperton, Ian Allan; ISBN 0-7110-1338-1.
- Harrower, John (1998), The Wilson Line : the history and fleet of Thos. Wilson, Sons & Co. and Ellerman's Wilson Line Ltd., Gravesend, UK: The World Ship Society, ISBN 978-0-905617-72-5
- Haws, Duncan (1993); Merchant Fleets – Britain's Railway Steamers – Eastern & North Western + Zeeland and Stena; Hereford, TCL Publications; ISBN 0-946378-22-3.
