= Arthur Wilson (shipping magnate) =

English ship-owner and shipping magnate

Arthur Wilson (14 December 1836 – 1909) was a prominent Yorkshire ship-owner who is best known for playing host to his friend Albert Edward, Prince of Wales, at his home Tranby Croft, the scene of the royal baccarat scandal.

== Life ==
Arthur Wilson was born on 14 December 1836 in Hull, Yorkshire. His father was Thomas Wilson, owner of the Thomas Wilson Sons & Co. shipping business. His brother was Charles Wilson, who was later created Baron Nunburnholme.

Like his brother, he was educated at Kingston College in Hull. He was associated with Charles throughout his life, and became the head of the business after his brother's death in 1907. Before this, he served as director of the North Eastern Railway, and chairman of the shipping committee of the Hull Chamber of Commerce. He was High Sheriff of Yorkshire for 1891.

For the last twenty years of his life, his London home was 17 Grosvenor Place, a building which now serves as the embassy of Ireland.

Wilson's son Arthur entered Parliament as a Unionist for the Holderness division of Yorkshire in 1900. Wilson himself was active in protecting the Liberal interest in Yorkshire, but spoke against Gladstone's Home Rule bill, and joined the Liberal Unionists. In 1909, he spoke in favour of tariff reform.

Wilson died of cancer in 1909, two years after taking charge of the shipping business.

He was a generous benefactor to Hull, and is especially remembered for the Victoria Children's Hospital, for which he served as chairman.

== Royal baccarat scandal ==
Arthur Wilson is best remembered for playing host, at Tranby Croft in 1890, to Albert Edward, Prince of Wales. During the Prince's stay, one of the party, William Gordon-Cumming, was accused of cheating at the game of baccarat. Baccarat was widely popular in England at the time, but had recently been declared illegal. Several members of Wilson's household at Tranby Croft claimed to have independently witnessed Gordon-Cumming cheating at the game, and after this was brought to the attention of the Prince, Gordon-Cumming signed a document promising never to play cards in the future. This event remained secret for a time, but was inevitably revealed to the press in early 1891. As a result, Gordon-Cumming brought his accusers, including Wilson, to trial on the charge of defamation.

Gordon-Cumming lost the court case, but it brought the Prince much bad publicity, and he never returned to Tranby Croft.

== See also ==
- Oswald Sanderson, managing director at Thomas Wilson Sons & Co.
