= USS Waukesha =

Cargo ship of the United States Navy

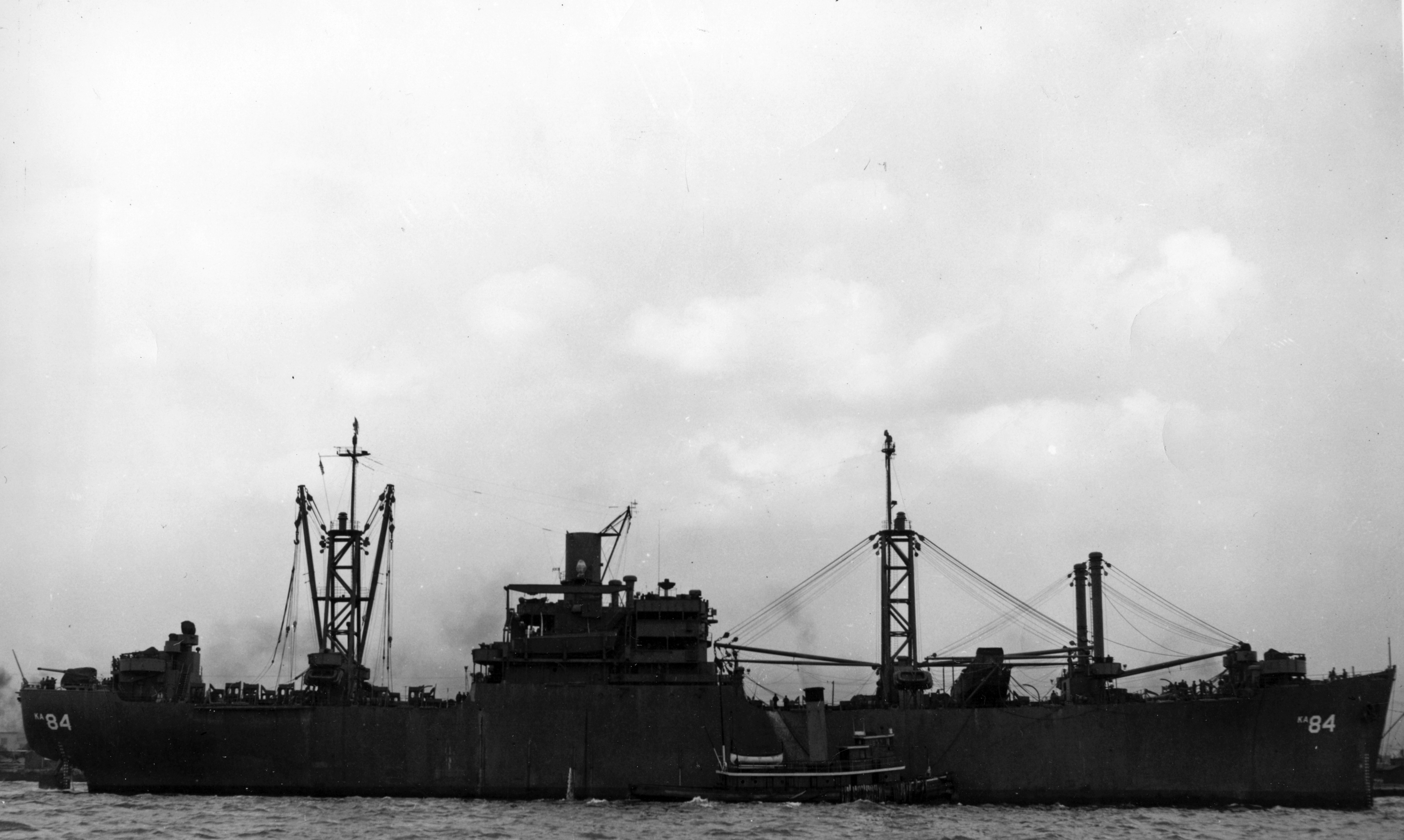

History

United States
- Name: USS Waukesha
- Namesake: Waukesha County, Wisconsin
- Builder: North Carolina Shipbuilding Company, Wilmington, North Carolina
- Laid down: 3 July 1944
- Launched: 6 September 1944
- Decommissioned: 10 July 1946
- Renamed: SS Mary Luckenbach; SS Bayou State
- Stricken: 31 July 1946
- Honors and awards: 1 battle star (World War II)
- Fate: Sold into merchant service, 1947; Scrapped October 1970

General characteristics
- Class & type: Tolland-class attack cargo ship
- Displacement: 13,910 long tons (14,133 t) full
- Length: 459 ft 2 in (139.95 m)
- Beam: 63 ft (19 m)
- Draft: 26 ft 4 in (8.03 m)
- Speed: 16.5 knots (30.6 km/h; 19.0 mph)
- Complement: 395
- Armament: 1 × 5"/38 caliber gun; 4 × twin 40 mm guns; 16 × 20 mm guns

USS Waukesha (AKA-84) was a Tolland-class attack cargo ship in service with the United States Navy from 1945 to 1946. She was sold into commercial service and was scrapped in 1970.

== History ==
Waukesha was named after Waukesha County, Wisconsin. She was laid down as a Type C2-S-AJ3 ship under a Maritime Commission contract (MC hull 1395) on 3 July 1944, at Wilmington, North Carolina, by the North Carolina Shipbuilding Company; launched on 6 September 1944; sponsored by Mrs. H. V. Mason; converted to an attack cargo ship by the Todd-Erie Shipyard of New York City; and commissioned at the New York Navy Yard.

=== World War II, 1945 ===
Following shakedown in Chesapeake Bay, Waukesha got underway for the Pacific on 27 March 1945. She transited the Panama Canal in company with sister ship Vinton (AKA-83) on 2 April and arrived at Pearl Harbor on the 17th. She conducted exercises and maneuvers in the Hawaiian area before getting underway on 11 May and proceeding via Eniwetok and Ulithi to Okinawa.

The cargo ship arrived at Buckner Bay on 13 July, with Convoy OKU-17, dropped anchor, and commenced unloading her cargo. Twice the operation was interrupted by fierce typhoons which whirled into Buckner Bay and forced the ships at anchor to get underway and make for the relative safety of the open sea. In addition, Japanese nuisance raids continued nightly, keeping all hands at general quarters for long periods.

Her next orders — to proceed to Pearl Harbor — were cancelled when the ship received news that the Japanese were entertaining thoughts of surrender in the aftermath of the explosions of two atomic bombs. Crew members aboard the ship initially did not believe that the Japanese were considering surrender, and did not know of such actions due to missing a routine newsletter that declared the surrender official. The attack cargo ship instead steered a course for Guam and arrived at Apra Harbor on the 12th. Two days later, she embarked men and material of the 14th Marine Regiment. She was ready for sea on the following day, 15 August 1945, the day on which the Japanese accepted the terms of the Potsdam Declaration.

=== Post-war activities, 1945–1946 ===
"V-J Day" only marked the beginning of another phase of Waukesha's brief Navy career — the occupation of the Japanese home islands. She rendezvoused with units of the 3rd Fleet off Honshū and entered Tokyo Bay on the 27th, anchoring off the bomb-scarred Yokosuka Naval Base on the 30th to commence offloading her men and equipment to support the occupation.

Waukesha returned to Saipan on 5 September and embarked men of the 2nd Marine Division; transferred some of her own men to other ships for transportation back to the United States; and took on supplies for a second trip to Japanese ports. She arrived at Nagasaki and tied up at Dejima Wharf on the 24th, to disembark her marines of the occupation force.

Underway for the Philippines four days later, the ship transferred four landing boats to Oconto (APA-187) at Subic Bay on 4 October and then obtained five boats from the Army Boat Pool in Lingayen Gulf before moving to Manila. Loading cargo occupied the ship in the Philippines before she sailed for Japan for her third and final visit to that country's ports, carrying cargo to Honshū and reaching Kii Suido on 23 October.

Shifting to Nagoya on 1 November, Waukesha embarked demobilized sailors, soldiers, and marines to transport them home in "Operation Magic Carpet." After departing Nagoya on the 9th, she made port at Seattle, Washington, on the 21st and unloaded her passengers before proceeding south for San Francisco. The ship later made more Far Eastern cruises and called at Okinawa en route to Qingdao, China, where she arrived on 2 March 1946. Remaining until 8 March, the attack cargo ship set course, via Okinawa, for San Diego, California, which she reached on 15 April 1946. Waukesha departed San Diego on 30 April and steamed, via the Panama Canal, to the east coast. She arrived at Norfolk, Virginia, on 24 May.

=== Decommissioning and fate ===
Decommissioned and returned to the United States Maritime Commission's War Shipping Administration on 10 July 1946, the attack cargo ship was struck from the Navy List on 31 July 1946.

Acquired by the Luckenbach Steamship Co. of New York City in 1947, the erstwhile warship was renamed SS Mary Luckenbach. At 17:05 on 25 August 1950, Mary Luckenbach collided with the hospital ship USS Benevolence (AH-13) just off San Francisco. Benevolence sank in 15 minutes with a loss of 23 lives out of 505 aboard. Among those lost was the prospective commanding officer of the newly recommissioned Benevolence, Captain William "Pineapple Bill" Murray.

Mary Luckenbach operated with the same firm until 1959, when the ship was sold and renamed SS Bayou State. She sailed under the flag of the States Marine Lines of New York until 1970. She was sold to Taiwan Shipbreakers and arrived at Kaohhiung, Taiwan on 29 September 1970 and scrapped, beginning in October of the same year.
