= USS Merganser (AMS-26) =

Minesweeper of the United States Navy

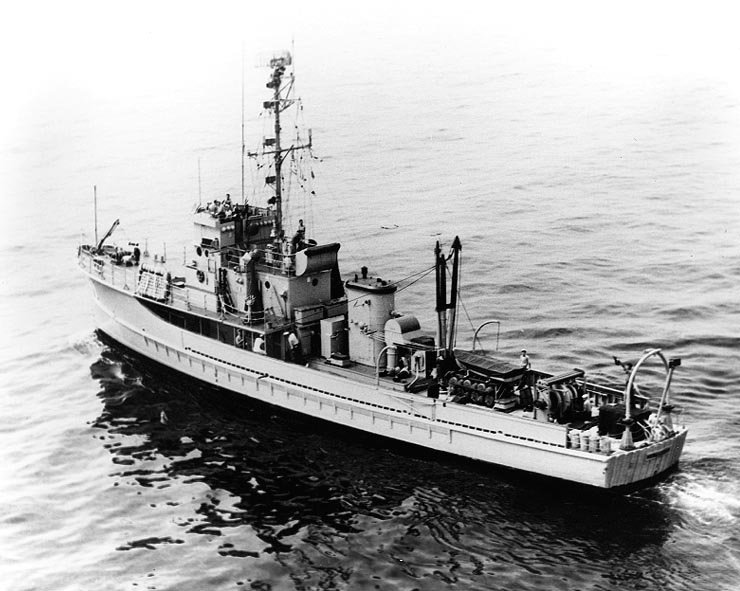

History

United States
- Name: USS YMS-417
- Builder: Stadium Yacht Basin; Cleveland, Ohio
- Laid down: 9 January 1944
- Launched: 29 June 1944
- Commissioned: 11 November 1944
- Renamed: USS Merganser (AMS-26), 17 February 1947
- Namesake: the merganser bird
- Reclassified: AMCU-47, 1 October 1954
- Reclassified: MHC-47, 7 February 1955
- Decommissioned: 2 April 1958
- Stricken: 1 May 1959
- Honors and awards: 9 battle stars, Korean War
- Fate: Sold, 5 May 1960

General characteristics
- Class & type: YMS-135 subclass of YMS-1-class minesweepers
- Displacement: 272 tons
- Length: 136 ft (41 m)
- Beam: 25 ft 4 in (7.72 m)
- Draft: 8 ft (2.4 m)
- Propulsion: 2 × 880 bhp General Motors 8-268A diesel engines; 2 shafts
- Speed: 15 knots (28 km/h)
- Complement: 32
- Armament: 1 × 3"/50 caliber gun mount; 2 × 20 mm guns; 2 × depth charge projectors

USS Merganser (AMS-26/AMCU-47/MHC-47) was a YMS-1-class minesweeper of the YMS-135 subclass built for the United States Navy during World War II.

== History ==
Merganser was laid down as YMS-417 by Stadium Yacht Basin of Cleveland, Ohio on 9 January 1944; launched 29 June 1944; and commissioned 11 November 1944.

Assigned to the 1st Naval District after commissioning, YMS-417 operated along the northern New England coast until 20 July 1945. She then got underway for Pearl Harbor and duty with the Pacific Fleet. Arriving in Hawaiian waters in October, she was assigned to the Philippine Sea Frontier and continued her voyage, reporting to ComPhilSeaFron in January 1946. The next month she was transferred to Minesweeping Squadron, Pacific Fleet.

In January 1947, the motor minesweeper commenced a 9-month tour of minesweeping operations in the western Carolines, Marshalls, and Marianas, giving primary attention to the waters near Truk and Guam. During this period, on 17 February she was redesignated AMS-26 and named Merganser.

She was next attached to the Naval Operating Base, Marianas and operated from Guam for the next 3 years, conducting minesweeping exercises and ASW patrols, and providing target towing services.

On 16 September 1950 Merganser departed Guam for Sasebo, Japan, to join the U.N. forces then fighting in and along the coast of Korea. Within 2 weeks she had joined TF 95 and was participating in action off Wonsan.

On 1 October 1950, Merganser assisted the 12 survivors of sister ship Magpie when the latter was sunk after hitting a cluster of three 1,000-pound mines. Merganser took five of the most severely injured survivors to hospital ship Repose of Pusan.

She conducted minesweeping operations along the eastern, southern, and western coasts of Korea throughout the Korean War. After the s:Korean Armistice Agreement was signed, she remained as a unit of the Escort and Blockading Patrol. Before leaving the area in mid 1954, she served several tours as observer for Armistice violations off the west coast of Korea.

Merganser departed Sasebo 21 August 1954 for the Puget Sound Naval Shipyard, where she underwent conversion to AMCU-47, commencing 1 October. Upon completion of conversion, she was assigned to the Harbor Defense Unit, Port Townsend, Washington, where she remained until April 1955. With the designation MHC-47 effective 7 February 1955, Merganser conducted underwater sound tests at Carr Inlet Acoustics Range in Washington for the first 2 weeks in April and then got underway for duty with the 11th Naval District at San Diego, California. There, until February 1958, she provided target towing and sonar training services, conducted harbor defense exercises, and performed search and rescue missions.

On 2 February 1958 she was attached to the San Diego Group, Pacific Reserve Fleet, and began inactivation overhaul. Two months later, 2 April 1958, after more than 13 years of service, she decommissioned and was berthed at San Diego. She was struck from the Naval Vessel Register 1 May 1959 and on 5 May 1960 was sold to Hilburg and Turpin of Los Angeles, California.

Merganser received nine battle stars for Korean War service.
