= USS Redhead (AMS-34) =

Minesweeper of the United States Navy

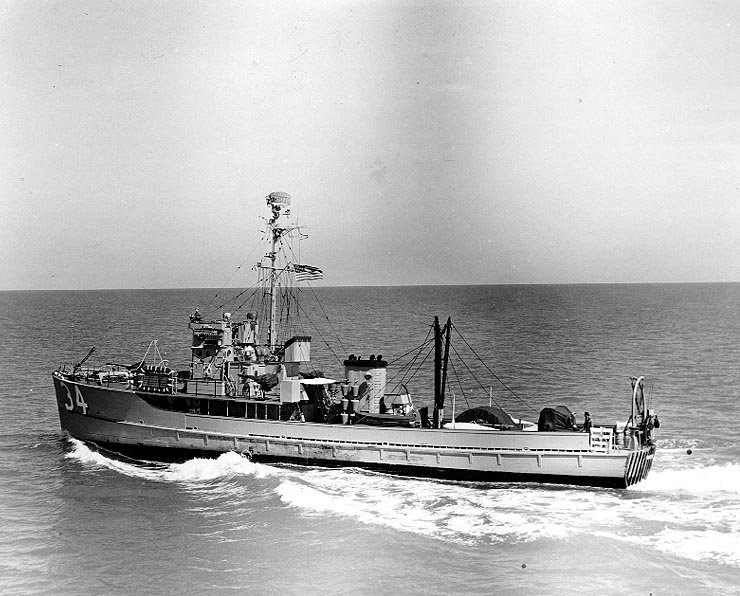

History

United States
- Ordered: as USS YMS-443
- Laid down: 21 October 1943
- Launched: 5 May 1944
- Commissioned: 15 December 1944
- Decommissioned: 6 December 1957
- Stricken: 1 November 1959
- Fate: fate unknown

General characteristics
- Displacement: 320 tons
- Length: 136 ft (41 m)
- Beam: 24 ft 6 in (7.47 m)
- Draught: 10 ft (3.0 m)
- Speed: 13 knots
- Complement: 34
- Armament: one 3 in (76 mm) gun mount, two 20 mm machine guns, two depth charge tracks

USS Redhead (AMS-34/YMS-443) was a YMS-1-class minesweeper of the YMS-135 subclass built for the United States Navy during World War II. She was the first U.S. Navy ship to be named for the Redhead duck.

== History ==
YMS-443 was laid down 21 October 1943 by the Hiltebrant Dry Dock Co., Kingston, New York; launched 5 May 1944; and commissioned 15 December 1944.

=== World War II service ===
Following shakedown, YMS-443 operated off the U.S. East Coast until the spring when she transited the Panama Canal 10 April. She served briefly at Pearl Harbor, Eniwetok, and Guam, then steamed further west for her initial combat duty, at Okinawa. Arriving 26 June 1945, she remained in the Ryukyus, engaged in minesweeping and antisubmarine patrol duties, with one interruption for availability in the Philippines until 6 September 1945. Then ordered to Japan, she swept the Kochi Channel, Wakayama and Hiro Wan areas until 12 February 1946 when, with a crew of men eligible for discharge, she departed Kobe for the United States.

Arriving at San Francisco, California, 27 March, she headed west again 27 November and operated at Pearl Harbor, Johnston Island, Eniwetok, Guam, and Woleai for the remainder of the year. Named Redhead and reclassified AMS-34, 18 February 1947, she continued her postwar clearing operations at Truk, Satawan, Guam, Saipan, Ngulu Island, Palau, Malakal, Karor Island, Chichi Jima, and Yokosuka.

=== Korean War service ===
Remaining in Japanese waters throughout 1948, 1949, and into 1950, Redhead steamed for Korea on 12 July 1950 to help defend South Korea. A unit of Mine Division 31, Redhead served in task force TF 95 and, during the latter part of 1950 and the early months of 1951, operated off both coasts of the Korean Peninsula, sweeping moored mines with "O" type gear, acting as a mine destruction vessel and as a minesweep gear retriever.

==== Redhead receives the Presidential Unit Citation ====
Redhead received the Presidential Unit Citation for operations against enemy forces in Korea from 11 to 24 October 1950. Operating as part of task unit TU 95.61, Redhead assisted in sweeping and buoying a channel 2,000 yards wide and 14 miles in length, to the outer limits of Wonsan Harbor, during which time heavy concentrations of enemy contact mines were swept. On 12 October, after aiding in the clearance of a channel through two heavily mined contact-type minefields, Redhead encountered a third field of extreme density and immediately conducted rescue operations for the survivors of Pirate (AM-275) and Pledge (AM-277) which had both been sunk by mines. Straddled continually by enemy shore battery fire for approximately a half-hour, Redhead assisted in silencing at least three of the hostile shore batteries and successfully evaded many mines to carry out rescue activities. She then returned to the minesweeping assignment and completed the clearance of an area through "one of the heaviest concentrations of enemy mines ever encountered in naval history."

==== Varied minesweeping operations in Korean waters ====
During the latter part of 1951 and the early months of 1952, Redhead's operations took her to Pukhan Suido; Yasu, South Korea; and Wonsan. There, in addition to her "O" type gear, she now streamed the acoustic hammerbox and "open and closed jigs" for use in sweeping acoustic and magnetic minefields, while incidental duties included air-sea rescue, night patrols, and investigation of suspicious fishing vessels and junks, which were often used by the Communists for minelaying.

==== Clearing mines under enemy fire ====
From 7 May until 3 June 1952, Redhead penetrated deep into Wonsan Harbor to clear mines while close to heavy shore guns and permit entry of friendly bombardment vessels. Redhead conducted magnetic, acoustic, and moored check sweeps off Inchon during June and July 1952, and patrolled a night picket station off Songjin during August. Participating in operations off the east coast of Korea, 12 August to 8 September, Redhead dispersed a concentration of enemy sampans by scoring hits on two of the craft in the face of heavy enemy shore battery fire. Then from 12 to 15 October, she led her formation close to the shore at Kojo, where, under intense enemy fire, they successfully completed their mission.

During 1953 Redhead continued minesweeping and night identification patrol duties off Wonsan, the Yang Do Islands, Cho To, Po Hang, and Daengyong Do.

=== Post-Korean War operations ===
Remaining in Korea after the July 1953 truce, Redhead continued to carry out night patrol duties off the eastern coast of Korea into the later summer of 1954. On 1 September 1954, she reported to the Yokosuka Ship Repair Facility and was reclassified minehunter AMCU-48. She was again reclassified, to MHC-48, on 7 February 1955. On 28 April 1955 she got underway for San Francisco, California, arriving 25 May.

She then proceeded to Seattle, Washington, where she joined the Harbor Defense unit, 13th Naval District. Through 1956 and into 1957 she carried out channel investigation in the Strait of Juan De Fuca and Puget Sound. In October 1957, however, she shifted to Astoria, Oregon, where she decommissioned 6 December 1957 and joined the Columbia River Group, Pacific Reserve Fleet, where she remained until struck from the Navy list 1 November 1959.

== Awards and honors ==
In addition to receiving the Presidential Unit Citation, Redhead earned three battle stars for World War II service and 10 battle stars during the Korean War.

== See also ==
- USS Redhead for other ships of the same name.
