= Chris Lowney =

American economist

Chris Lowney (born 1958) is an American writer, public speaker, and leadership consultant. He is a board member of WittKieffer and former chair of the Board of CommonSpirit Health, America's second largest health system with $37 billion in annual revenue. He was formerly a managing director of J.P. Morgan.

== Biography ==
Born in New York City, Lowney attended Regis High School, a Jesuit institution in Manhattan, and then entered a Jesuit novitiate. He completed a B.A. in history and an M.A. in philosophy at Fordham University (both in 1981) and was elected to Phi Beta Kappa. He left the Jesuit seminary in 1983 and worked at JP Morgan from 1983 to 2001. At Morgan, he was an investment banker to Fortune 1000 companies and, later, a managing director in Tokyo and Singapore, where he served on Morgan's Asia-Pacific management committee. Later, as a managing director in London, he served on Morgan's Europe, Mideast, and Africa management committee.

After leaving Morgan in 2001, Lowney authored six books and co-authored three more. He has delivered talks and conferences on leadership, decision-making, and business ethics throughout the U.S. and in Spain, France, Australia, Argentina, Uruguay, Colombia, Indonesia, and many other countries.

He is a board member of WittKieffer, an executive search and leadership advisory firm. He is a former chair of the Board of CommonSpirit Health, America's second-largest nonprofit health system with some $37 billion in annual revenue. He also chairs the board of Commonweal Magazine.

Lowney founded Pilgrimage for Our Children's Future, which funds education and healthcare projects in the developing world. He helped launch Jesuit Commons-Higher Education at the Margins, which offers university-level education in refugee camps. He conceived and co-founded Contemplative Leaders in Action, a young adult leadership formation program active in seven cities.

== Personal life ==
Lowney is Catholic.

== Awards ==
Lowney has been awarded honorary doctoral degrees by Sacred Heart University, Loyola University of Maryland, Gonzaga University, St. Louis University, the University of Scranton, the University of Great Falls, and Marymount Manhattan College, Chestnut Hill College, Wheeling Jesuit University, and Fairfield University, and Albertus Magnus College.

He was named a miembro honorario del claustro at Peru's Universidad del Pacifico, was 2009 commencement speaker at the Ateneo de Manila University in the Philippines, was 2024 Master's degree commencement speaker at Deusto University in Spain, and delivered the 2012 JRD Tata Oration at XLRI in India.

== Publications ==
Lowney has contributed columns on leadership for Forbes and for Aleteia. His other authored works include:

- Heroic Leadership: Best Practices from a 450-Year-Old Company that Changed the World (Loyola Press, 2003); number-one ranked bestseller of the CBPA and has been translated into eleven languages. The book was named to the Reading List of the Commandant of the U.S. Marine Corps. A companion book, The Heroic Leadership Workbook, was published in 2025 (Loyola Press).
- A Vanished World: Muslims, Christians, and Jews in Medieval Spain (Free Press, 2005; Oxford University Press, 2006); nominated for La Corónica award.
- Heroic Living: Discover Your Purpose and Change the World (2010)
- Pope Francis: Why He Leads the Way He Leads (2013)
- Everyone Leads: How to Revitalize the Catholic Church (2017) The book won 2nd place in its category in the 2018 Catholic Press Association Awards
- Make Today Matter: 10 Habits for a Better Life (and World) (2018) won a 2018 Independent Press Award as a Distinguished Favorite in the Inspiration category and a 2019 Independent Press Award for Self-Help: Spiritual. The book also won a gold medal in the 2019 Illumination Awards and Make Today Matter is a Finalist in the Self-Help: Motivational category of the 2019 International Book Awards.
- Official Guide to the Camino Ignaciano, new updated edition, co-authored with Jose Luis Iriberri, S.J. (Jesuit Sources, 205)
- On the Ignatian Way, co-authored with Jose Luis Iriberri, S.J. (2018)
