= USS Benevolence =

Haven class hospital ship

Coordinates: 37°46′53″N 122°33′4″W

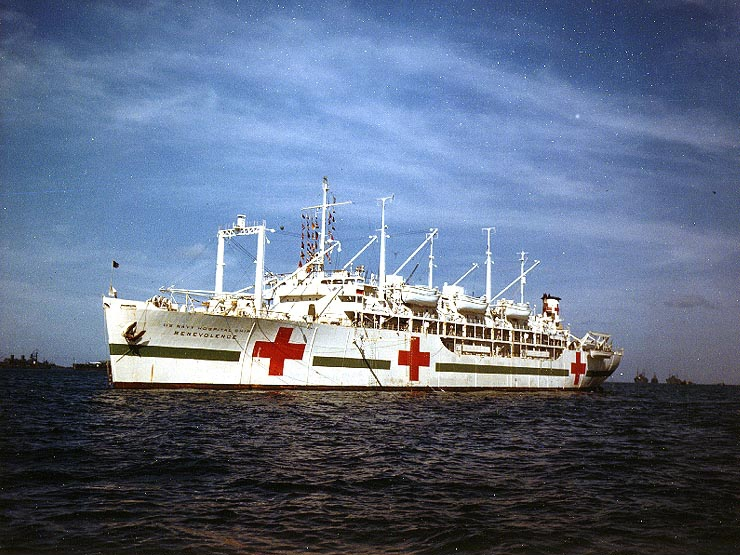
- USS Benevolence (AH-13) Moored in Bikini Atoll lagoon, during Operation Crossroads, mid-July 1946. Several of the operation target ships are visible in the background.

History

United States
- Ordered: 19 February 1942
- Launched: 24 June 1944
- Acquired: 19 June 1944
- Commissioned: 5 May 1945
- Decommissioned: 1 July 1947; 30 June 1947
- Fate: Sunk off San Francisco, California, in a collision 25 August 1950

General characteristics
- Displacement: 11,141 tons empty (15,100 max)
- Length: 520 ft (160 m)
- Beam: 71.6 ft (21.8 m)
- Draught: 24 ft (7.3 m)
- Installed power: Two boilers
- Propulsion: One geared steam turbine, single screw
- Speed: 17.5 knots
- Capacity: 802 patients
- Complement: 95 officers, 606 enlisted men
- Armament: None

USS Benevolence (AH-13) a United States Navy Hospital Ship, was built as SS Marine Lion in 1944 by Sun Shipbuilding & Drydock Co., in Chester, Pennsylvania, under a Maritime Commission contract. She was a C4-class ship, which were the largest cargo ships built by the United States Maritime Commission (MARCOM) during World War II. Among the variations of the design were the Haven-class hospital ship, including Benevolence and five others.

She displaced 11,141 tons fully loaded, was 520 feet (160 m) long, had a beam of 71.6 feet (21.8 m) and a draft 24 feet (7.3 m). Her maximum speed was 17.5 knots (32.4 km/h; 20.1 mph). She was sponsored by Mrs. Daisy Unter, transferred to the United States Navy on 31 July 1944, converted to a hospital ship by Todd-Erie Basin Shipyard, Inc., Brooklyn and was commissioned on 12 May 1945.

== World War II ==
With a bed capacity of 802 and a complement of 564, the Benevolence departed for the Pacific on 27 July 1945 to provide hospital services, consultation, preventive medicine, and casualty evacuation. She began her operational career receiving battle casualties from the 3rd Fleet during campaigns against Japan.

== Post war ==
Upon VJ Day, Benevolence was with the Allied fleet in Tokyo Harbor during the Surrender of Japan. She anchored off Yokosuka, Japan, 29 August to begin processing liberated Allied prisoners of war where she screened 1520 prisoners of war. She remained in Japanese waters until 27 November 1945 and then returned wounded to the United States, arriving in San Francisco on 12 December 1945. She served as a casualty evacuation ship between Pearl Harbor and San Francisco from December until February 1946 and then underwent an overhaul until 1 April 1946.

She participated in Operation Crossroads at Bikini Atoll in June 1946. She then served as a station hospital ship at Tsingtao, China from 14 October 1946 until 3 March 1947. She returned to San Francisco on 18 March 1947 and commenced inactivation and was placed out of commission in reserve 13 September 1947, attached to the San Francisco Reserve Group.

== Sinking ==
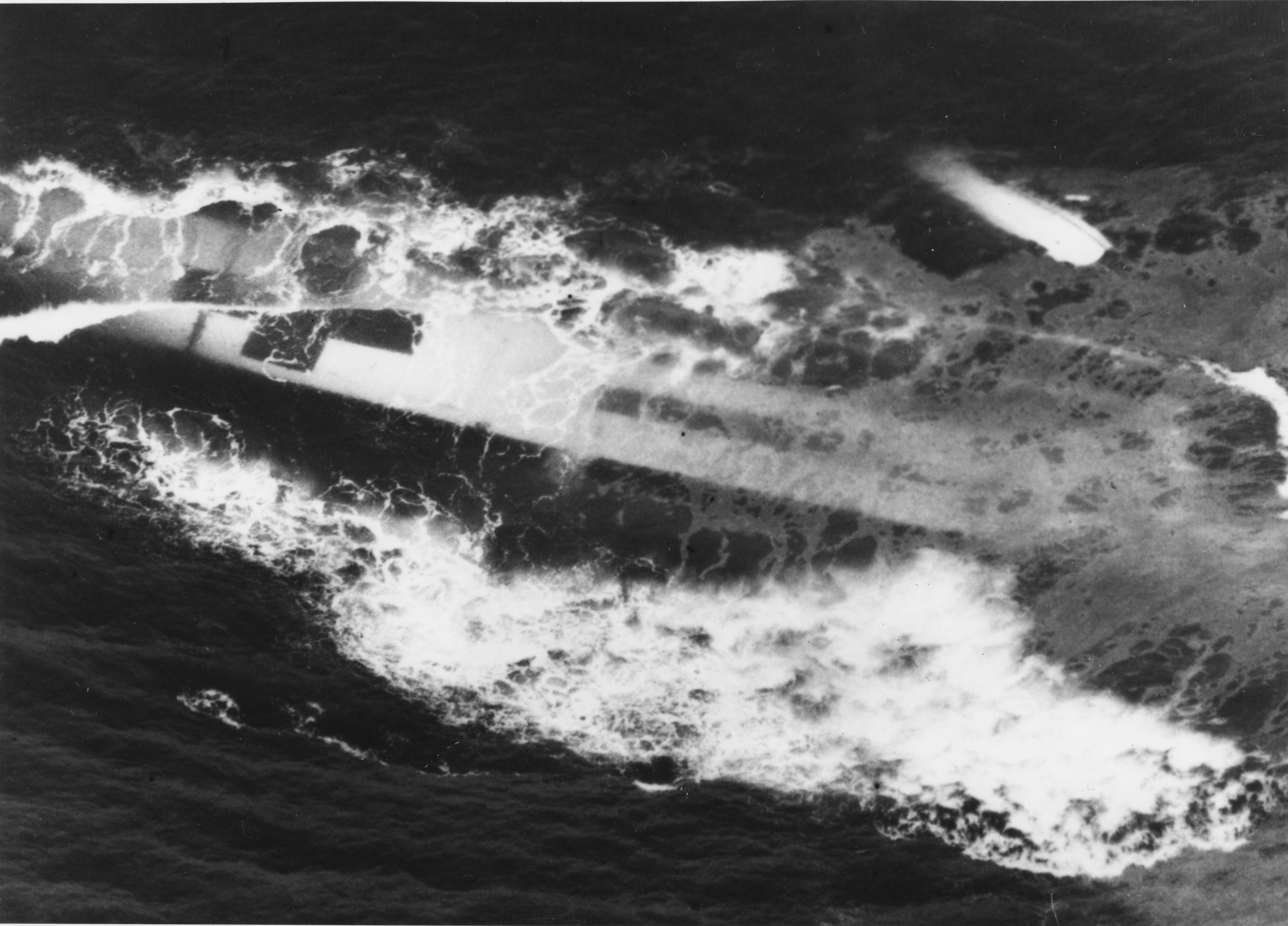
USS Benevolence sinking

On 25 August 1950 at 5:04 p.m. while returning from sea trials, prior to her assignment to the Military Sea Transportation Service in support of the Korean War effort, Benevolence collided with the freighter SS Mary Luckenbach in heavy fog and sank within 15 minutes off San Francisco. Five hundred and five crew members were rescued and 23 died.

The Defense Department announced on 31 July 1951 that the vessel was unsalvageable and would be dynamited as a menace to navigation.

== Awards ==
- Asiatic–Pacific Campaign Medal with one battle star
- World War II Victory Medal
- Navy Occupation Service Medal with "ASIA" clasp
- China Service Medal
