= MV Santagata =

Cargo ship

History
- Name: Empire Farmer (1943–45); Administrateur en Chef Thomas (1945–49); Santagata (1949–50)
- Owner: Ministry of War Transport (1943–45); French Government (1945–48); Compagnie des Transports Atlantiques (1948–49); Achille Lauro & Co (1949–50)
- Operator: Lyle Shipping Co Ltd (1943–45); Compagnie Générale Transatlantique (1945–48); Compagnie des Transports Atlantiques (1948–49); Achille Lauro & Co (1949–50)
- Port of registry: Newcastle upon Tyne, United Kingdom (1943–45); Le Havre, France (1945–49); Naples, Italy (1949–50)
- Builder: Sir W G Armstrong, Whitworth & Co (Shipbuilders) Ltd
- Yard number: 3
- Launched: 8 March 1943
- Completed: May 1943
- Out of service: 24 November 1950
- Identification: United Kingdom Official Number 119166 (1943–45); Code Letters BFDC (1943–45); Code Letters FPPJ (1945–49)
- Fate: Wrecked

General characteristics
- Type: Cargo ship
- Tonnage: 7,049 GRT; 4,875 NRT; 10,499 DWT
- Length: 430 ft 9 in (131.29 m)
- Beam: 56 ft 2 in (17.12 m)
- Draught: 26 ft 9 in (8.15 m)
- Depth: 35 ft 2 in (10.72 m)
- Installed power: Triple-expansion steam engine (1943–49); Diesel engine (1949–50).; 2,500 horsepower (1,900 kW) (steam engine)
- Propulsion: Single screw propeller
- Speed: 11 knots (20 km/h)
- Crew: 32 (Santagata)

Santagata was a 7,049 GRT cargo ship that was built in 1943 by Sir W G Armstrong, Whitworth & Co (Shipbuilders) Ltd, Newcastle upon Tyne, United Kingdom as Empire Farmer for the Ministry of War Transport (MoWT). In 1945, she was sold to the French Government and renamed Administrateur en Chef Thomas. A further sale to Italy in 1950 saw her renamed Santagata. She was wrecked on the Goodwin Sands later that year.

== Description ==
The ship was built in 1944 by Sir W G Armstrong, Whitworth & Co (Shipbuilders) Ltd, Newcastle upon Tyne, Northumberland. She was yard number 3.

The ship was 430 feet 9 inches (131.29 m) long, with a beam of 56 feet 2 inches (17.12 m). She had a depth of 35 feet 2 inches (10.72 m) and a draught of 26 feet 9 inches (8.15 m). She was assessed at 7,049 GRT, 4,875 NRT, 10,499 DWT.

As built, the ship was propelled by a 2,500 horsepower (1,900 kW) triple expansion steam engine, which had cylinders of 24 1/2 inches (62 cm), 39 inches (99 cm) and 70 inches (180 cm) diameter by 48 inches (120 cm) stroke. The engine was built by the North East Marine Engine Co. (1938) Ltd, Newcastle upon Tyne. It drove a single screw propeller. The engine could propel the ship at a speed of 11 knots (20 km/h).

== History ==
Empire Farmer was launched on 8 March 1943 and completed in May 1943. The Code Letters BFDC and United Kingdom Official Number 169166 were allocated. Her port of registry was Newcastle upon Tyne. She was operated under the management of Lyle Shipping Co Ltd.

Empire Farmer made her maiden voyage as part of Convoy FN1037, which departed from Southend, Essex on 2 June 1943 and arrived at Methil, Fife on 4 June. She joined the convoy from the River Tyne on 3 June. Empire Farmer then joined Convoy EN.238, which departed from Methil that day and arrived at Loch Ewe on 6 June. She then joined Convoy KMS19G, which departed from the Clyde on 25 June and passed Gibraltar on 6 July. becoming Convoy KMS 19, which arrived at Malta on 22 July as part of Operation Husky. Empire Farmer was carrying the Convoy Commodore. She then joined Convoy KMS19T, which departed from Malta on 23 July and arrived at Tripoli, Libya the next day. She departed from Tripoli on 26 July as a member of Convoy MKS19Y, which arrived at Gibraltar on 31 July. She left the convoy at Bizerta, Algeria the next day. Empire Farmer departed from Bizerta on 30 August to join Convoy MKS23, which had departed from Alexandria, Egypt on 25 August and arrived at Gibraltar on 3 September. She left the convoy at Philippeville the next day.

Empire Farmer sailed from Philippeville on 16 September and joined Convoy UGS16, which had departed from the Hampton Roads, Virginia, United States on 27 August and arrived at Malta on 24 September. She then formed Convoy TSS 6, which departed from Malta on 22 September. Empire Farmer is next recorded as departing from Salerno, Italy on 5 October, arriving at Malta two days later. During this voyage she transported a number of Royal Marines bound for HMS Phoenicia. She sailed the next day for Tripoli, Libya, where she arrived on 9 October. She departed on 20 October as a member of Convoy TX5, which arrived at Alexandria on 25 October. She continued on to Port Said, Egypt, arriving the next day. Empire Farmer departed from Port Said on 6 November and arrived back at Alexandria the next day. She departed with Convoy MKS31 on 13 November, leaving the Convoy at Augusta, Sicily, Italy and joining Convoy AH9A, which departed on 19 November and arrived at Bari, Italy two days later. Convoy MKS 31 arrived at Gibraltar on 23 November. She then sailed to Brindisi, Italy, departing on 28 November with Convoy HA.10, which arrived at Augusta two days later. Empire Farmer departed from Augusta on 2 December and joined Convoy GUS23, which had departed from Port Said on 27 November and arrived at the Hampton Roads on 25 December. She left the convoy at Gibraltar on 8 December. Empire Farmer departed from Gibraltar on 19 December to join Convoy OS61, which arrived at Freetown, Sierra Leone on 29 December.

Empire Farmer departed from Freetown on 2 January 1944 as a member of Convoy STL9, which arrived at Lagos, Nigeria on 8 January. She departed on 13 January for Calabar, Nigeria, where she arrived two days later. She departed on 21 January and arrived back at Lagos on 24 January. Empire Farmer departed from Lagos on 28 January for Takoradi, Gold Coast, arriving two days later. She sailed on 1 February to join Convoy LTS9, which had departed from Lagos on 30 January and arrived at Freetown on 5 February. Empire Farmer then joined Convoy SL149, which departed on 11 February and rendezvoused with Convoy MKS40 at sea on 22 February. The combined convoy arrived at Liverpool, Lancashire on 7 March. Empire Farmer left the convoy and put into Loch Ewe, arriving on 6 March. She then joined Convoy WN558A, which arrived at Methil on 8 March, where she joined Convoy FS1386, which arrived at Southend on 11 March.

Empire Farmer departed from Southend on 12 June and spent the next five weeks sailing in convoy to and from the Seine Bay. She departed from the Seine Bay on 21 July with Convoy FTM44, which arrived at Southend on 22 July. She left the convoy at Portsmouth, Hampshire on 21 July and then sailed from The Solent the next day to join Convoy EBC33, which had departed from the Seine Bay on 21 July and arrived at the Bristol Channel on 23 July. Empire Farmer arrived at Cardiff, Glamorgan on 23 July. She sailed on 14 August for the Belfast Lough, where she arrived the next day. She sailed on 18 August to join Convoy ON249 which had departed from Liverpool that day and arrived at New York, United States on 2 September.

Empire Farmer sailed from New York on 10 September for the Hampton Roads, Virginia. She then joined Convoy UGS54, which departed on 12 September and arrived at Port Said on 10 October. She left the convoy at Augusta, arriving on 5 October. She joined Convoy VN69, which departed the next day and arrived at Naples on 7 October. She sailed from Naples on 28 October for Gibraltar, where she arrived on 1 November. Empire Farmer departed from Gibraltar on 5 November with Convoy GC95, arriving at Casablanca, Morocco the next day. She departed from Casablanca on 11 November to join convoy GUS57, which had departed from Gibraltar on 1 November and arrived at the Hampton Roads on 30 November. Empire Farmer departed from the Hampton Roads on 15 December for Cristóbal, Colón, Panama, where she arrived on 23 December. She then sailed to Balboa, Panama, from where she sailed on 24 December for Iquique, Chile, arriving on 1 January 1945.

Empire Farmer departed from Iquique on 7 January 1945 for Balboa, arriving on 16 January. She then sailed to Cristóbal, from where she departed on 18 January with Convoy ZG116, which arrived at Guantanamo Bay, Cuba on 22 January. Empire Farmer departed from Guantanamo Bay the next day as a member of Convoy GN183, which arrived at the Hampton Roads on 30 January. She then joined convoy UGS73, which departed on 7 February and arrived at Gibraltar on 23 February. She sailed two days later for Port Said, arriving on 6 March. Empire Farmer then sailed to Suez, Egypt from where she departed on 16 March for Aden, arriving on 21 March. She sailed the next day for Diego-Suarez, Mozambique, arriving on 30 March. Empire Farmer sailed on 14 April for Majunga, Madagascar from where she departed on 18 April for Durban, South Africa, where she arrived on 23 April. She departed on 10 May for Colombo, Ceylon, arriving on 27 May. She sailed on 28 June for Cochin, India, where she arrived two days later.

Empire Farmer sailed from Cochin on 8 July for Durban, arriving on 24 July and departing three days later for Buenos Aires, where she arrived on 12 August. She sailed ten days later for Rosario, Argentina, arriving on 23 August. She departed on 28 August for Buenos Aires, arriving the next day. Empire Farmer sailed on 3 September for Montevideo, Uruguay, arriving two days later. She sailed on 8 September for the Cape Verde Islands, arriving on 24 September and sailing later that day for London, where she arrived in October.

Empire Farmer departed from London on 11 November for Hull, Yorkshire, arriving the next day. She was transferred to the French Government on 15 November 1945 and renamed Administrateur en Chef Thomas, in honour of Thomas Prudent, who was mortally wounded on 6 August 1944 whilst attempting to escape from a train after being arrested by the Gestapo for his part in the St. Nazaire Raid on 28 March 1942. Her port of registry was Le Havre and the Code Letter FPPJ were allocated. She was operated under the management of the Compagnie Générale Transatlantique (CGT). On 4 December, she departed from Le Havre on her maiden voyage in CGT service, bound for New York. Further voyages saw her visit Nantes, Marseille and the African coast. On 22 July 1947, she was in collision the tanker Wyoming Valley at New Orleans, Louisiana, United States. and was damaged. On 2 December 1947, Administrateur en Chef Thomas collided with USS LCT-932 at Bassens, Gironde, causing a leak to her stern. On 1 August 1948, she was sold to the Compagnie des Transports Atlantiques, Le Havre.

In October 1949, she was sold to Achille Lauro & Co, Naples and renamed Santagata. In 1950, the ship was re-engined with a 1940-built Burmeister & Wain 6-cylinder four-stroke Single Action diesel engine. On 23 December 1950, Santagata ran aground on the Goodwin Sands in the English Channel 3 nautical miles (5.6 km) north east of the South Goodwin Lightship whilst on a voyage from Casablanca, Morocco to Leith, Lothian, United Kingdom. She broke in two and was declared a total loss. All 32 crew were rescued by the Walmer Lifeboat, whose bowman collapsed and died as the lifeboat reached Santagata.
