= Sandro Santagata =

American physician-scientist

- Born: Astoria, New York

Academic background
- Education: Amherst College; Mount Sinai School of Medicine
- Doctoral advisor: Eugenia Spanopoulou

Academic work
- Discipline: Spatial biology; Molecular neuro-oncology; Pathology
- Institutions: Brigham and Women's Hospital; Dana–Farber Cancer Institute; Harvard Medical School

Sandro Santagata is an associate professor at Harvard Medical School and a physician-scientist at Brigham and Women's Hospital where he practices neuropathology. His research focuses on precision medicine in cancer biology.

== Education ==
Born in Astoria, New York, Santagata attended Regis High School. He graduated with a Bachelor of Arts degree in neuroscience from Amherst College and medical and doctor of philosophy degrees from the Medical Scientist Training Program at Mount Sinai School of Medicine. He trained as an intern in medicine at Mount Sinai Hospital and then in anatomic pathology and neuropathology in the Department of Pathology at Brigham and Women's Hospital.

== Career ==
During graduate school training at Mount Sinai School of Medicine in the laboratory of Eugenia Spanopoulou, Santagata and colleagues discovered that a partial loss of function in the RAG components of the V(D)J recombinase causes Omenn syndrome, a severe immunodeficiency disorder.

While at Mount Sinai, Santagata did fellowship training with Lawrence Shapiro using protein structure to determine the functions of poorly characterized proteins. After a residency and fellowship in pathology, he received a Mentored Clinical Scientist Development Award (K08) from the National Institute of Neurological Disorders and Stroke at the National Institutes of Health and worked with Susan Lindquist at the Whitehead Institute for Biomedical Research studying the role of the master regulator of the heat shock response, HSF1, in the development of cancer. In 2013, he started his research laboratory in the Department of Pathology at Brigham and Women's Hospital.

The Santagata laboratory uses high dimensional imaging techniques to study human disease to investigate the spatial biology and architecture of cancer, developing approaches for cell biology discovery using human surgical resection tissues, and building cancer atlases that use new tools to disseminate high-definition cancer maps. The Santagata laboratory has refined diagnostic criteria for brain tumors including gliomas, meningiomas and craniopharyngiomas, informed genetic counseling, and guided the formation of several clinical trials of targeted therapies. Their work has revealed new ways in which cancer cells adapt to environmental stressors and therapies. The lab has also helped develop and implement high-dimensional tissue imaging methods for the study of cancer and other human diseases. These tissue imaging methods are being used to develop atlases of cancer for Ludwig Cancer Research, the Gray Foundation, and the National Institutes of Health National Cancer Institute funded Cancer Systems Biology Consortium and Human Tumor Atlas Network.

Santagata is an author of the Oxford Textbook of Neuro-Oncology, Escourolle and Poirier's Manual of Basic Neuropathology and the World Health Organization Classification of Tumours. He practices neuropathology at Brigham and Women's Hospital and Boston Children's Hospital and is affiliated faculty at Dana Farber Cancer Institute. He is a member of the Harvard Medical School Laboratory of Systems Pharmacology and principal investigator of the Ludwig Center at Harvard.
