= Kingston upon Hull =

City in the East Riding, England

Kingston upon Hull Hull
- City and unitary authority area
- City of Kingston upon Hull
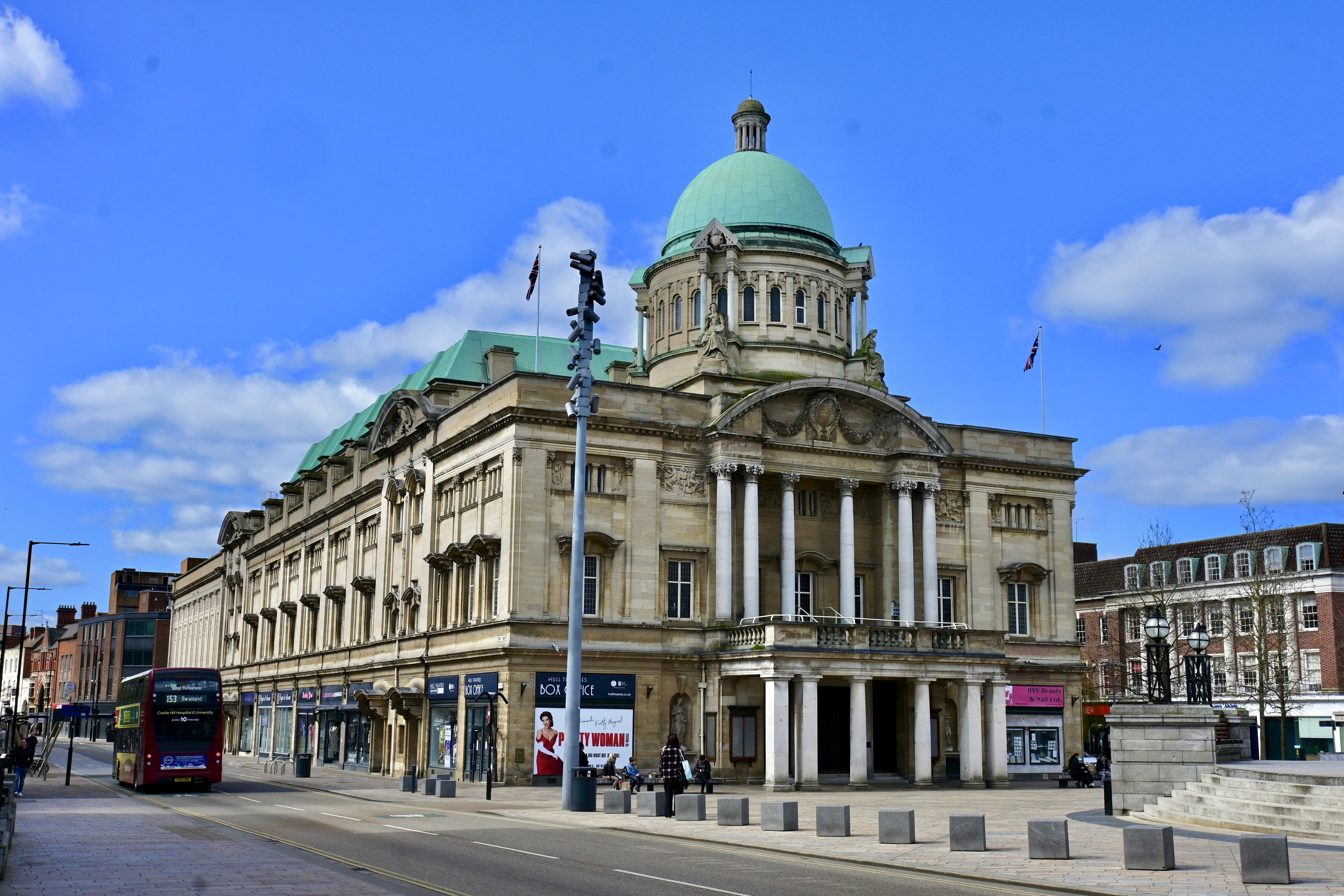
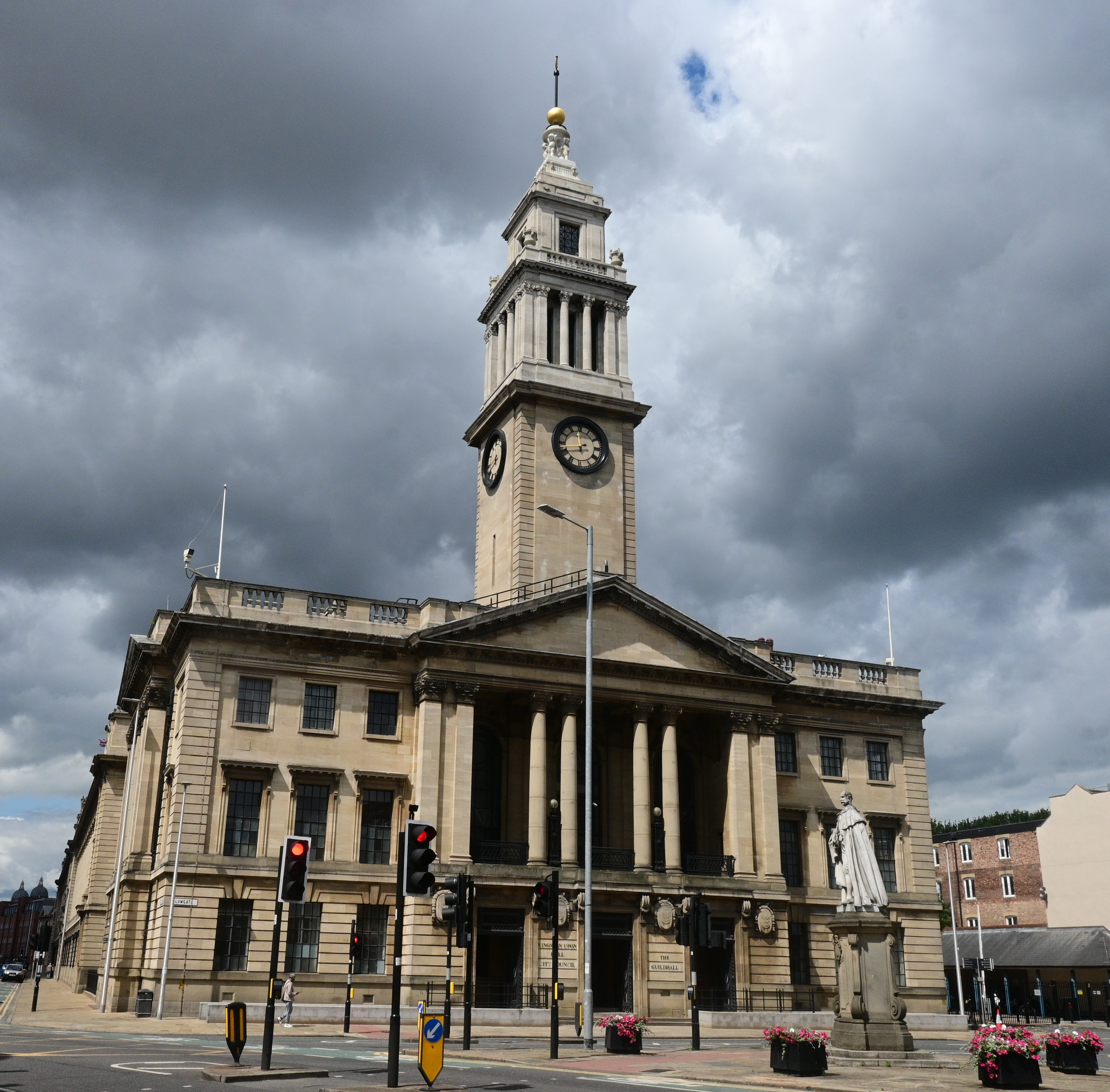
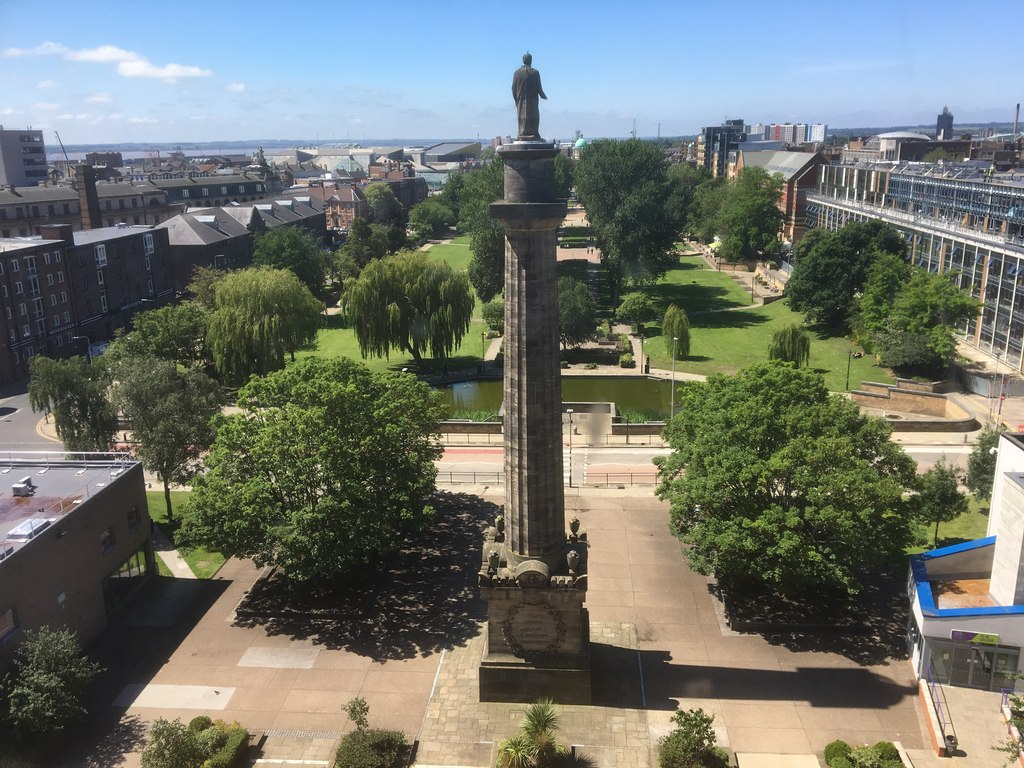
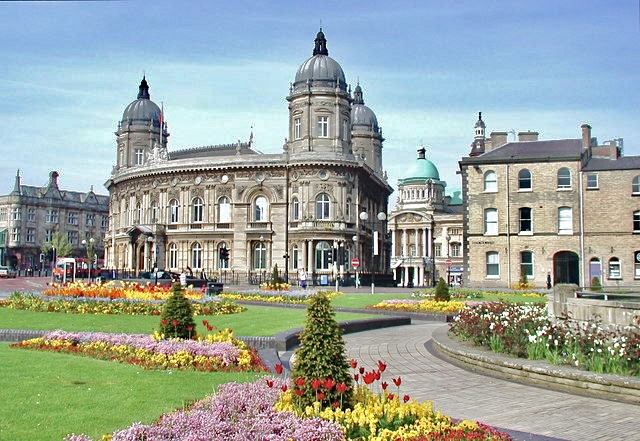
- City Hall Guildhall Wilberforce Monument Hull Marina Queen's Gardens The Deep (aquarium) The Minster

- Coat of arms

- Shown within the East Riding of Yorkshire

- Location within England Location within the United Kingdom Location in Europe
- Coordinates: 53°44′40″N 00°19′57″W
- Sovereign state: United Kingdom
- Country: England
- Region: Yorkshire and the Humber
- Ceremonial county: East Riding of Yorkshire
- Founded: 12th century
- City status: 1897
- Administrative headquarters: Guildhall

Government
  - Type: Unitary authority
  - Body: Hull City Council
  - Leadership: Leader and cabinet
  - Council control: Liberal Democrat
  - Members of Parliament: Emma Hardy (L); Diana Johnson (L); Karl Turner (L)
  - Lord Mayor: Maria Coward

Area
  - Land: 27.59 sq mi (71.5 km^{2})

Population (2025)
  - City: 273,257
  - Rank: (Ranked 67th)
  - Density: 9,410/sq mi (3,633/km^{2})
  - Urban: 314,018
  - Metro: 573,300 (LUZ)
  - Ethnicity (2011 Census): 89.7% White British; 4.1% White Other; 2.3% East Asian; 1.3% Mixed; 1.2% Black; 1.1% South Asian; 0.3% White Irish
- Demonyms: Hullensian
- Time zone: UTC+0 (Greenwich Mean Time)
  - Summer (DST): UTC+1 (British Summer Time)
- Postcode area: HU
- Dialling codes: 01482
- ISO 3166-2: GB-KHL
- ONS code: 00FA (ONS); E06000010 (GSS)
- NUTS 3: UKE11
- Police: Humberside
- Ambulance: Yorkshire
- Fire: Humberside
- Website: hull.gov.uk

Kingston upon Hull, or simply Hull, is a port city and unitary authority area in the East Riding of Yorkshire, England. It lies upon the River Hull at its confluence with the Humber Estuary, 25 miles (40 km) inland from the North Sea. It is a tightly bounded city which excludes the majority of its suburbs; with a population of 273,257 (2025), it is the fourth-largest city in the Yorkshire and the Humber region. The built-up area has a population of 436,300.

Hull has more than 800 years of seafaring history and is known as Yorkshire's maritime city. The town of Wyke on Hull was founded late in the 12th century by the monks of Meaux Abbey as a port from which to export their wool. Renamed Kings-town upon Hull in 1299, Hull had been a market town, military supply port, trading centre, fishing and whaling centre and industrial metropolis. Hull was an early theatre of battle in the English Civil Wars. Its 18th-century Member of Parliament, William Wilberforce, took a prominent part in the abolition of the slave trade in Britain.

The city offers a variety of museums and art galleries, a city centre marina and historic old town, notable architecture, and a thriving arts scene. Due to Hull's growing appeal as an outdoor film location, particularly for period dramas using the Old Town's historic streets and buildings, plans for a purpose-built film studio complex have been approved by Hull City Council. The £3m complex could open by the end of 2025. The city has earned the nickname "Hullywood" in recent years, after productions including The Crown, Enola Holmes 2, The Personal History of David Copperfield, Victoria and Blitz have been filmed in the city.

In 2017, it was the UK City of Culture and hosted the Turner Prize at the city's Ferens Art Gallery. Other notable landmarks in the city are the Minster, the tidal surge barrier, the Paragon Interchange and The Deep, Hull's award-winning aquarium. Areas of the town centre include the old town (including its museum quarter) and the marina. The University of Hull was founded in 1927 and had over 16,000 students in 2022. Rugby league football teams include clubs Hull F.C. and Hull Kingston Rovers. The city's association football club is Hull City (Premier League). Hull RUFC and Hull Ionians both play in the National League 2 North of rugby union.

The city came 2nd in the Time Out list of the 15 best places to visit in the UK in 2024, with the guide commenting that the city has got "The Deep, an enormous aquarium with 3,000 species, a picturesque old town which survived the city's relentless WWII bombings, and lots of up and coming indie art galleries like Ground and Artlink. Don't sleep on Hull". In 2016, it was named as one of the top 10 cities in the world to visit by Rough Guides alongside cities such as Seoul, Vancouver, Amsterdam and Reykjavik. In 2017, the city was featured in The Sunday Times Best Places to Live Guide and in 2024 was named as one of the UK's most "up and coming" places to move to. However, Kingston upon Hull has been ranked as one of the most deprived cities in the UK and the fourth most deprived local authority in the country. The city also has a lower than average life expectancy than the majority of the UK.

== History ==
=== Wyke and wool trade ===
Kingston upon Hull stands on the north bank of the Humber Estuary at the mouth of its tributary, the River Hull. The valley of the River Hull has been inhabited since the early Neolithic period, but there is little evidence of a substantial settlement in the area of the present city. The area was attractive to people because it gave access to a prosperous hinterland and navigable rivers but the site was poor, being remote, low-lying and with no fresh water. It was originally an outlying part of the hamlet of Myton, named Wyke. The name is thought to originate either from a Scandinavian word Vik meaning inlet or from the Saxon Wic meaning dwelling place or refuge.

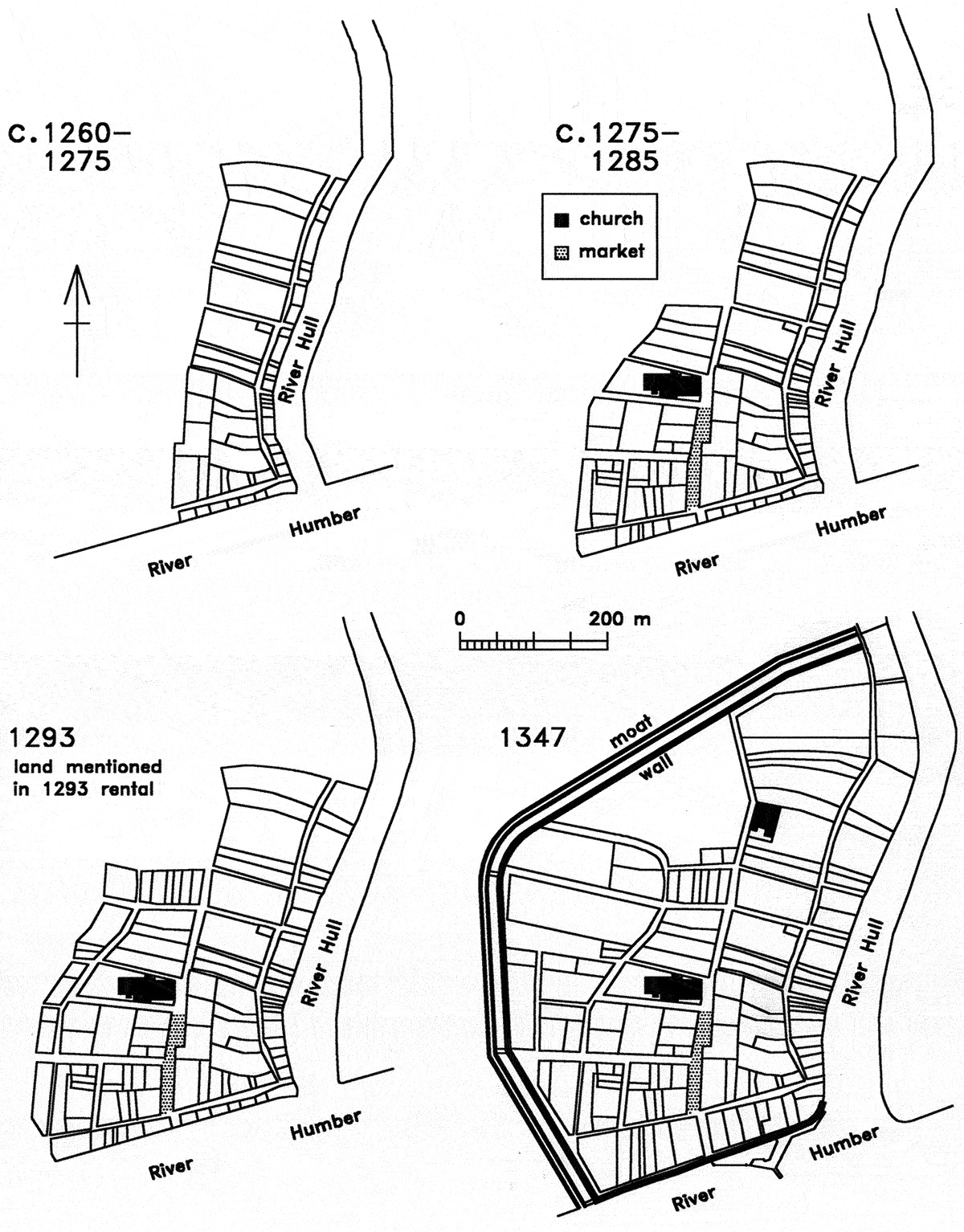
The urban growth of Hull between the 13th and 14th centuries

The River Hull was a good haven for shipping, whose trade included the export of wool from Meaux Abbey, which owned Myton. In 1293, the town of Wyke was acquired from the abbey by King Edward I, who, on 1 April 1299, granted it a royal charter that renamed the settlement King's town upon Hull or Kingston upon Hull. The charter is preserved in the archives of the Guildhall. When first created, the borough straddled the ancient parishes of Hessle and North Ferriby, but was remote from either parish church. A chapel of ease dedicated to Holy Trinity was built to serve the part of the borough in Hessle parish; that church subsequently became Hull Minster. St Mary's Church similarly began as a chapel of ease for the part of the borough in North Ferriby parish.

In 1440, a further charter incorporated the town and instituted local government consisting of a mayor, a sheriff and twelve aldermen.

In his Guide to Hull (1817), J. C. Craggs provides a colourful background to Edward's acquisition and naming of the town. He writes that the King and a hunting party started a hare which "led them along the delightful banks of the River Hull to the hamlet of Wyke ... [Edward], charmed with the scene before him, viewed with delight the advantageous situation of this hitherto neglected and obscure corner. He foresaw it might become subservient both to render the kingdom more secure against foreign invasion, and at the same time greatly to enforce its commerce". Pursuant to these thoughts, Craggs continues, Edward purchased the land from the Abbot of Meaux, had a manor hall built for himself, issued proclamations encouraging development within the town, and bestowed upon it the royal appellation, King's Town.

=== Prospering port ===
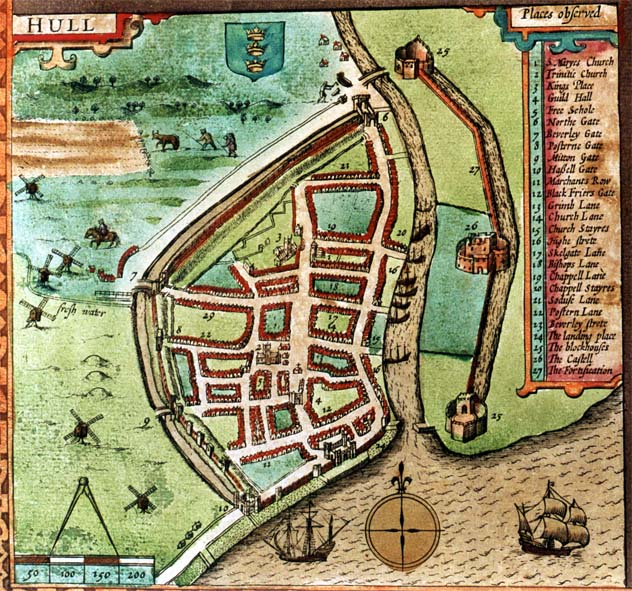
Map of Hull in 1611, from John Speed's The Theatre of the Empire of Great Britaine

The port served as a base for Edward I during the First War of Scottish Independence and later developed into the foremost port on the east coast of England. It prospered by exporting wool and woollen cloth, and importing wine and timber. Hull also established a flourishing commerce with the Baltic ports of the Hanseatic League.

From its medieval beginnings, Hull's main trading links were with Scotland and northern Europe. Scandinavia, the Baltic and the Low Countries were all key trading areas for Hull's merchants. In addition, there was trade with France, Spain and Portugal.

Sir William de la Pole was the town's first mayor. A prosperous merchant, de la Pole founded a family that became prominent in government. Another successful son of a Hull trading family was bishop John Alcock, who founded Jesus College, Cambridge and was a patron of the grammar school in Hull. The increase in trade after the discovery of the Americas and the town's maritime connections are thought to have played a part in the introduction of a virulent strain of syphilis through Hull and on into Europe from the New World.

The town prospered during the 16th and early 17th-centuries, and Hull's affluence at this time is preserved in the form of several well-maintained buildings from the period, including Wilberforce House, now a museum documenting the life of William Wilberforce.

=== English Civil War ===
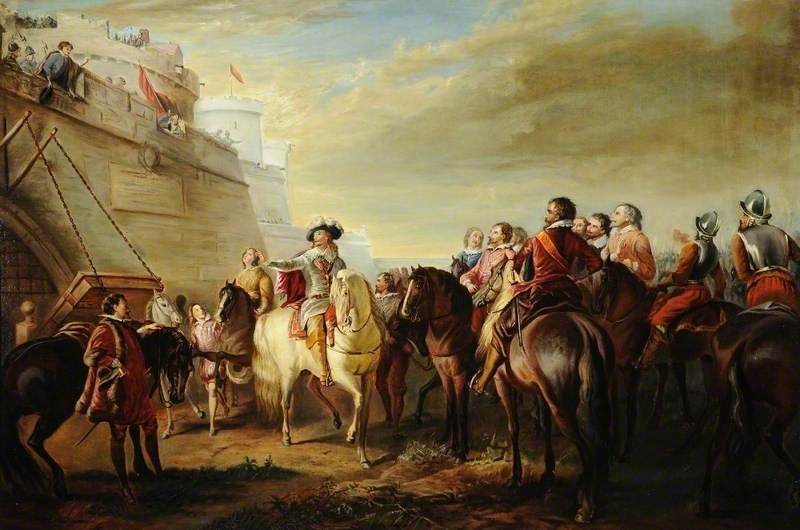
Charles I before Hull by Joseph Parrocel, oil on canvas, held at the Guildhall (date unknown)

During the English Civil War, Hull became strategically important because of the large arsenal located there. Very early in the war, on 11 January 1642, the king named the Earl of Newcastle governor of Hull while Parliament nominated Sir John Hotham and asked his son, Captain John Hotham, to secure the town at once. Sir John Hotham and Hull corporation declared support for Parliament and denied Charles I entry into the town. Charles I responded to these events by besieging the town. This siege helped precipitate open conflict between the forces of Parliament and those of the Royalists.

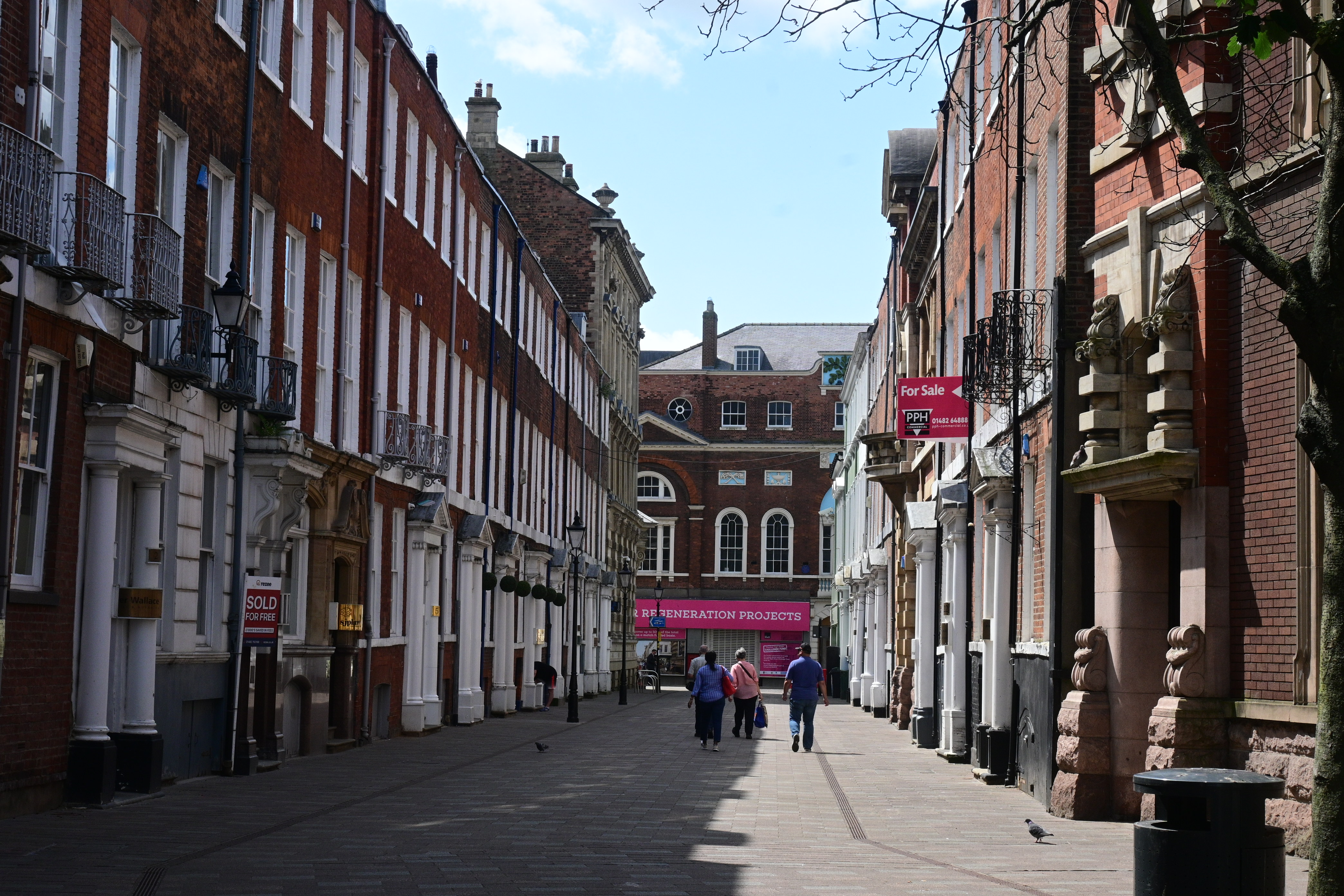
Parliament Street, a Georgian thoroughfare in the city centre, with Whitefriargate in the distance

After the Civil War, docks were built along the route of the town walls, which were demolished. The first dock (1778, renamed Queen's Dock in 1854) was built in the area occupied by Beverley and North gates, and the intermediate walls, which were demolished, a second dock (Humber Dock, 1809) was built on the land between Hessle and Myton gates, and a third dock between the two was opened 1829 as Junction Dock (later Prince's Dock).

Whaling played a major role in the town's fortunes until the mid-19th century. As sail power gave way to steam, Hull's trading links extended throughout the world. Docks were opened to serve the frozen meat trade of Australia, New Zealand and South America. Hull was also the centre of a thriving inland and coastal trading network, serving the whole of the United Kingdom.

=== City status ===
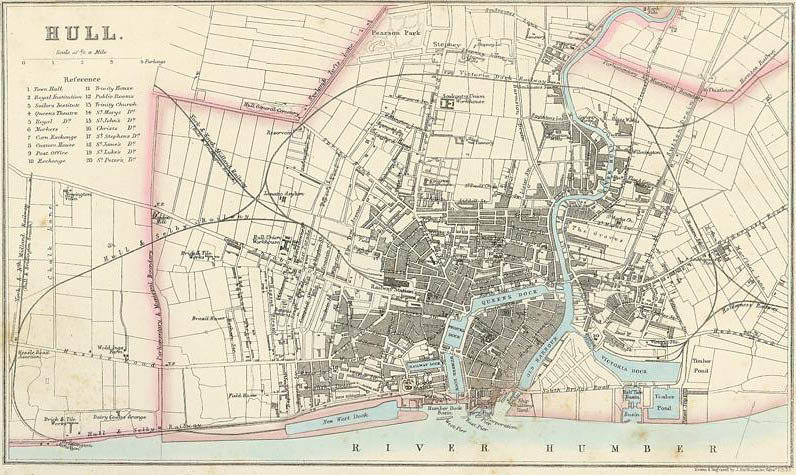
Hull in 1866

Throughout the second half of the 19th-century and leading up to the First World War, the Port of Hull played a major role in the emigration of Northern European settlers to the New World, with thousands of emigrants sailing to Hull and stopping for administrative purposes before travelling on to Liverpool and then North America.

Parallel to this growth in passenger shipping was the emergence of the Wilson Line of Hull (which had been founded in 1825 by Thomas Wilson).

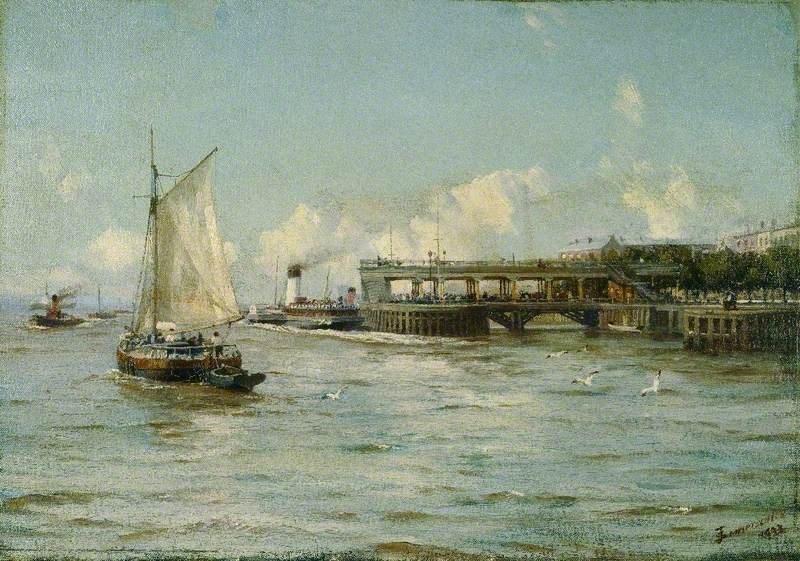
The Pier, Kingston upon Hull, oil on canvas, by Thomas Jacques Somerscales (1922), held by Ferens Art Gallery

By the early 20th-century, the company had grown – largely through its monopolisation of North Sea passenger routes and later mergers and acquisitions – to be the largest privately owned shipping company in the world, with over 100 ships sailing to different parts of the globe. The Wilson Line was sold to the Ellerman Lines – which itself was owned by Hull-born magnate (and the richest man in Britain at the time) Sir John Ellerman.

Hull's prosperity peaked in the decades just before the First World War; it was during this time, in 1897, that city status was granted. Many of the suburban areas on the western side of Hull were built in the 1930s, particularly Willerby Road and Anlaby Park, as well as most of Willerby itself.

=== Wartime bombing ===
The city's port and industrial facilities, its proximity to mainland Europe and ease of location being on a big estuary, led to much damage from bombing during the Second World War; much of the city centre was destroyed. Hull had 95 per cent of its houses damaged or destroyed, making it the second most severely bombed British city or town by number of damaged or destroyed buildings, after London, during the Second World War. More than 1,200 people died in air raids on the city and some 3,000 others were injured.

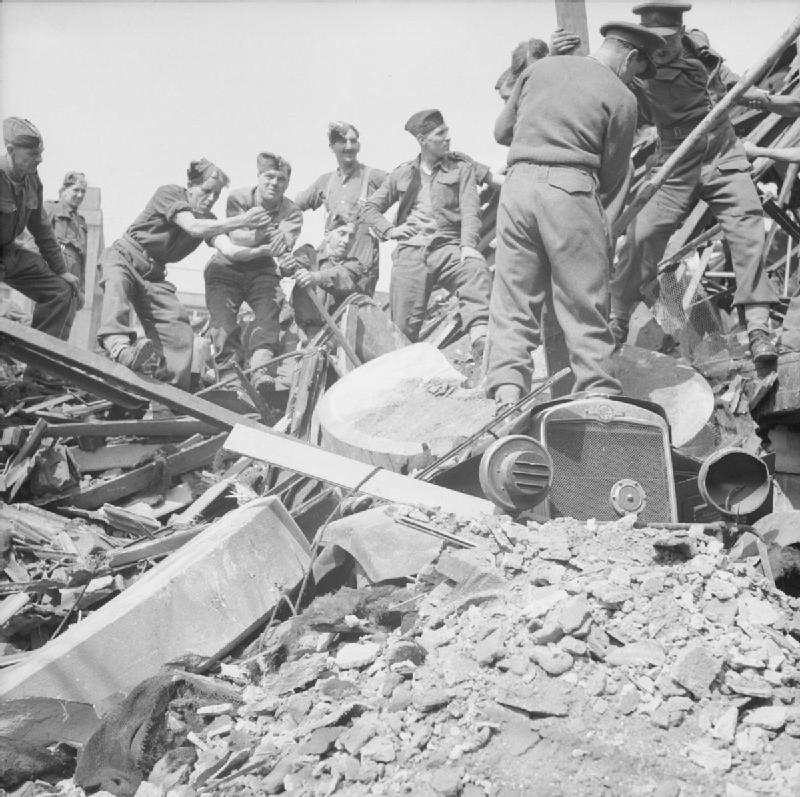
Troops of 9th Battalion, the Hampshire Regiment, helping to clear bomb damage in Hull

The worst of the bombing occurred in 1941. Little was known about this destruction by the rest of the country at the time, since most of the radio and newspaper reports did not reveal Hull by name but referred to it as "a North-East town" or "a northern coastal town". Most of the city centre was rebuilt after the war. In 2006, researchers found documents in the local archives that suggested an unexploded wartime bomb might be buried beneath the Boom, a redevelopment in Hull.

After the decline of the whaling industry after the Second World War, emphasis shifted to deep-sea trawling until the Anglo-Icelandic Cod War of 1975–1976. The conditions set at the end of this dispute started Hull's economic decline.

=== City of Culture ===
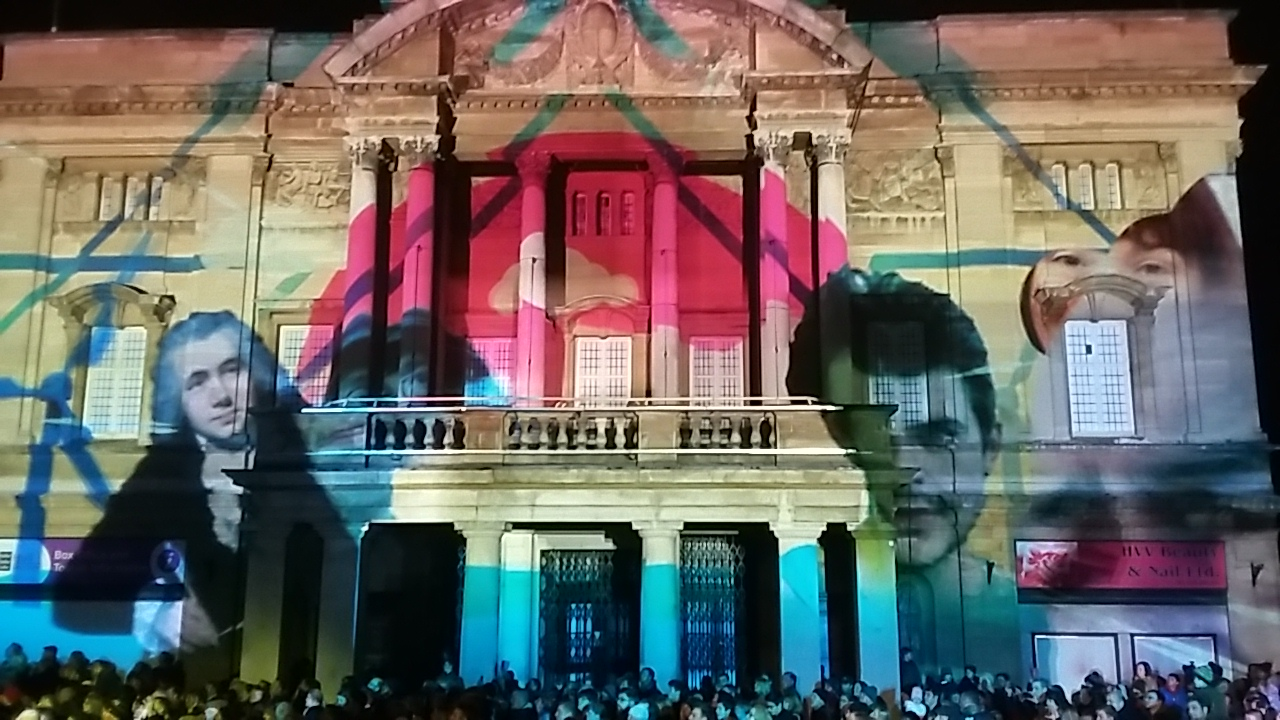
Hull City Hall during the opening event for Hull City of Culture 2017 event

In 2017 Hull was awarded the title of 'City of Culture' by the Department for Digital, Culture, Media and Sport. There were festivals in public spaces to promote the city and its new title. At the start of the year there was a huge firework display attracting a crowd of 25,000.

== Governance ==
=== Municipal ===
County		Borough/ district				Notes
Name	Type	Type	Dependent on county	From	Until	Notes
Yorkshire	Ancient	Borough	check	1299	1440	Town status from 1299
Yorkshire	County-at-large	County Corporate	X mark	1440	1835	Town status from 1299
Yorkshire	Historic	Municipal borough	check	1835	1889	Town status from 1299
East Riding of Yorkshire	Geographic	County borough	X mark	1889	1974	City status from 1897
Humberside	Non-metropolitan	Shire district	check	1974	1996	City status from 1897
East Riding of Yorkshire	Ceremonial	Unitary authority	X mark	1996	Current	City status from 1897

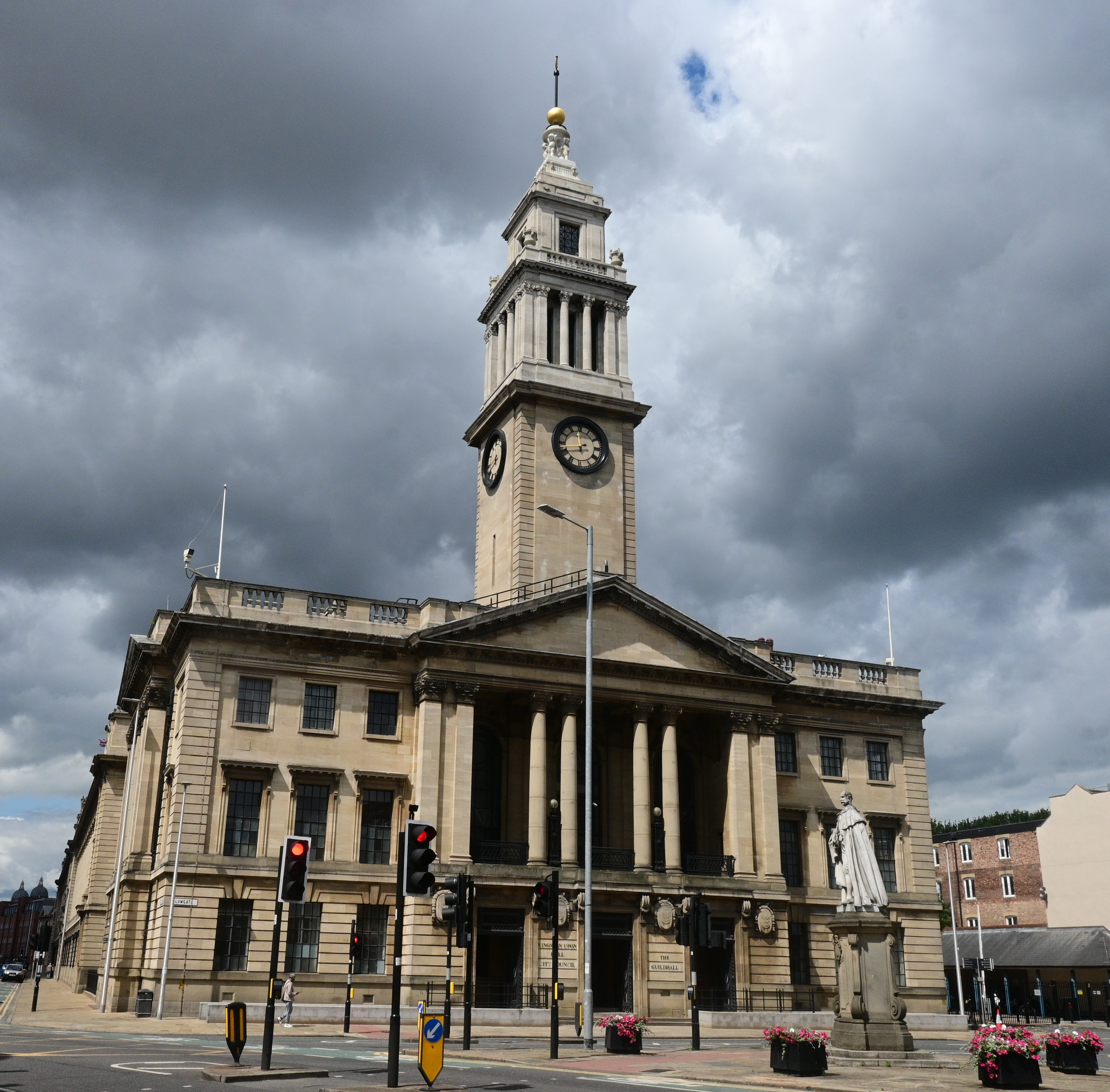
The Guildhall

Following the Local Government Act 1888, Hull became a county borough, a local government district independent of the East Riding of Yorkshire. This district was dissolved under the Local Government Act 1972, on 1 April 1974 when it became a non-metropolitan district of the newly created shire county of Humberside. Humberside (and its county council) was abolished on 1 April 1996 and Hull was made a unitary authority area.

The single-tier local authority of the city is now Hull City Council (officially Kingston upon Hull City Council), headquartered in the Guildhall in the city centre. The council was designated as the UK's worst performing authority in both 2004 and 2005, but in 2006 was rated as a two star 'improving adequate' council and in 2007 it retained its two stars with an 'improving well' status. In the 2008 corporate performance assessment the city retained its "improving well" status but was upgraded to a three star rating.

The Liberal Democrats won overall control of the City Council in the 2007 local elections, ending several years in which no single party had a majority. They retained control in the 2008 local elections by an increased majority and in the 2010 local elections. Following the UK's local elections of 2011, the Labour Party gained control of the council, increasing their majority in the 2012 and retained this following the 2014 local elections. They increased their majority by one in the 2015 local elections, but lost it in the 2016 local elections. In the 2018 local elections all of the council was up for election following boundary changes that reduced the number of seats by 2. Labour retained control of the council but with a much reduced majority, while in the 2019 local elections there was no change to the make-up of the council. In the 2021 local elections the Liberal Democrats gained a couple of seats but Labour retained control by just three seats. On 3 March 2022, Labour councillor Julia Conner defected to the Liberal Democrats, reducing the Labour majority to one. The Liberal Democrats won overall control of the City Council in the 2022 local elections to end ten years of Labour rule, increasing their majority in the 2023 local elections. They remained in control until the 2026 local elections when the council entered a period of no overall control.

=== Parliament ===
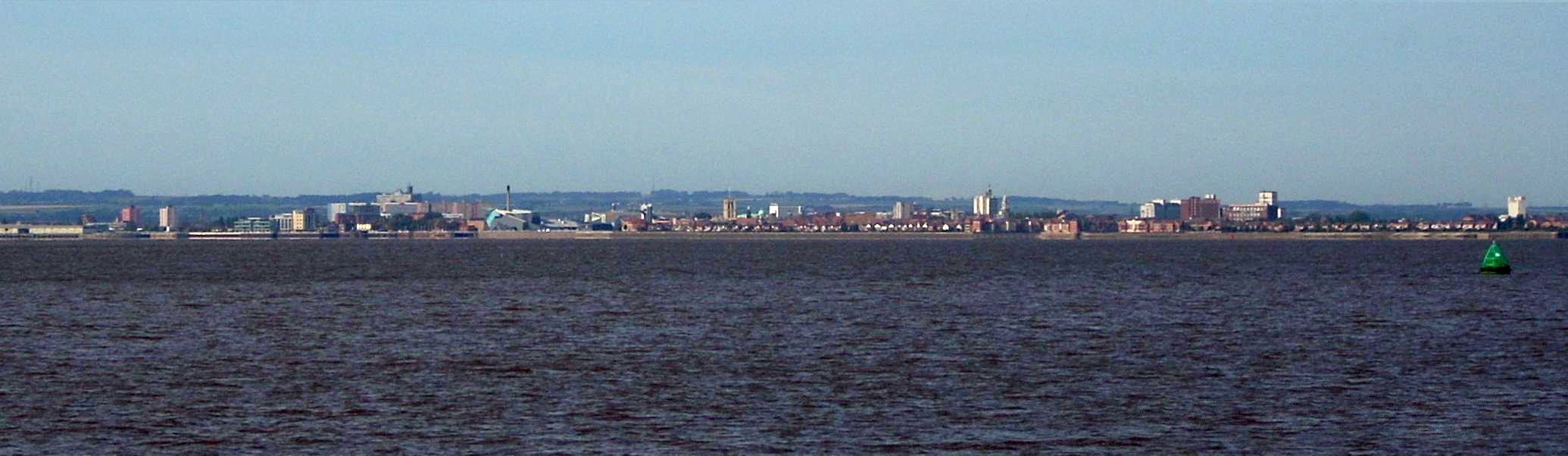
Panorama of Hull from further along the north bank of the Humber near Paull, with the Yorkshire Wolds rising behind the city

Hull constituencies' general election results, 1918–2019

The city returned three members of parliament to the House of Commons and at the last general election, in 2024, elected three Labour MPs: Emma Hardy, Diana Johnson and Karl Turner.

William Wilberforce is the most celebrated of Hull's former MPs. He was a native of the city and the member for Hull from 1780 to 1784 when he was elected as an Independent member for Yorkshire.

== Geography ==
Place	Distance	Direction	Relation
London	155 miles (249 km)	South	Capital city
Lincoln	37 miles (60 km)	South	Nearby city
Doncaster	36 miles (58 km)	South-west	Nearby city
York	34 miles (55 km)	North-west	Historic county town
Beverley	8 miles (13 km)	North	County town
Brough	12 miles (19 km)	West	Town

The River Hull tidal barrier and the Millennium Bridge

Kingston upon Hull is on the northern bank of the Humber Estuary. The city centre is west of the River Hull and close to the Humber. The city is built upon alluvial and glacial deposits which overlie chalk rocks but the underlying chalk has no influence on the topography. The land within the city is generally very flat and is only 2 to 4 metres (6.5 to 13 ft) above sea level. Because of the relative flatness of the site there are few physical constraints upon building and many open areas are the subject of pressures to build.

The parishes of Drypool, Marfleet, Sculcoates, and most of Sutton parish, were absorbed within the borough of Hull in the 19th and 20th centuries. Much of their area has been built over, and socially and economically they have long been inseparable from the city. Only Sutton retained a recognisable village centre in the late 20th century, but on the south and east the advancing suburbs had already reached it. The four villages were, nevertheless, distinct communities, of a largely rural character, until their absorption in the borough—Drypool and Sculcoates in 1837, Marfleet in 1882, and Sutton in 1929. The current boundaries of the city are tightly drawn and exclude many of the metropolitan area's nearby villages, of which Cottingham is the largest. The city is surrounded by the rural East Riding of Yorkshire.

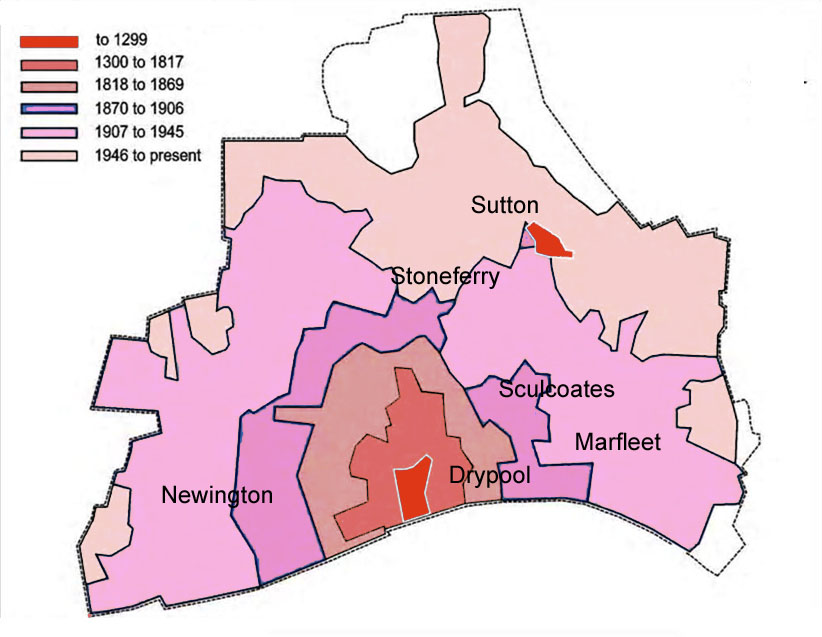
The expansion of Kingston upon Hull

Some areas of Hull lie on reclaimed land at or below sea level. The Hull Tidal Surge Barrier is at the point where the River Hull joins the Humber Estuary and is lowered at times when unusually high tides are expected. It is used between 8 and 12 times per year and protects the homes of approximately 10,000 people from flooding. Due to its low level, Hull is expected to be at increasing levels of risk from flooding due to global warming.

Historically, Hull has been affected by tidal and storm flooding from the Humber; the last serious floods were in the 1950s, in 1953, 1954 and the winter of 1959.

Many areas of Hull were flooded during the June 2007 United Kingdom floods, with 8,600 homes and 1,300 businesses affected.

Further flooding occurred in 2013, resulting in a new flood defence scheme to protect homes and businesses, stretching 4 miles (6.4 km) from St Andrews Quay Retail Park to Victoria Dock, linking to other defences at Paull and Hessle. Started in 2016, it was completed in early 2021. The scheme was officially opened on 3 March 2022, by Rebecca Pow.

At around 00:56 GMT on 27 February 2008, Hull was 30 miles (48 km) north of the epicentre of an earthquake measuring 5.3 on the Richter Scale which lasted for nearly 10 seconds. This was an unusually large earthquake for this part of the world. Another notable quake occurred early in the morning of 10 June 2018.

=== Climate ===
Located in Northern England, Hull has a temperate maritime climate which is dominated by the passage of mid-latitude depressions. The weather is very changeable from day to day and the warming influence of the Gulf Stream makes the region mild for its latitude. Locally, the area is sunnier than most areas this far north in the British Isles, and also considerably drier, due to the rain shadowing effect of the Pennines. It is somewhat warmer than west coast areas at a similar latitude such as Liverpool in summer due to stronger shielding from maritime air but also colder in winter and North Sea breezes keep the city cooler than inland areas during summer. It is also one of the most northerly areas where the July average maximum temperature exceeds 21.5 °C (70.7 °F), although this appears to be very localised around the city. Flooding in June 2007 caused significant damage to areas of the city. Droughts and heatwaves also occur such as in 2003, 2006 and recently in 2018.

The absolute maximum temperature recorded is 36.9 °C (98.4 °F), set in July 2022. Typically, the warmest day should reach 28.8 °C (83.8 °F), though slightly over 10 days should achieve a temperature of 25.1 °C (77.2 °F) or more in an "average" year. All averages refer to the 1991–2020 period.

The absolute minimum temperature is −11.1 °C (12.0 °F), recorded during January 1982. Winters are generally mild for the latitude with snow only occurring a couple of times a year on average and mostly only staying for a day or two before melting. It is frequently cloudy and the North Sea winds make it feel colder than it actually is. An average of 29 nights should report an air frost. Heavy snowfalls do occasionally occur such as in 2010.

On 23 November 1981, during the record-breaking nationwide tornado outbreak, Hull was struck by two tornadoes which passed through, and caused damage to residential buildings across the north-eastern suburbs of Hull and uprooted trees.

Climate data for Kingston upon Hull: Average maximum and minimum temperatures, and average rainfall recorded between 1991 and 2020 by the Met Office.
Month	Jan	Feb	Mar	Apr	May	Jun	Jul	Aug	Sep	Oct	Nov	Dec	Year
Mean daily maximum °C (°F)	7.7 (45.9)	8.5 (47.3)	10.8 (51.4)	13.6 (56.5)	16.6 (61.9)	19.5 (67.1)	22.0 (71.6)	21.8 (71.2)	18.9 (66.0)	14.7 (58.5)	10.6 (51.1)	7.9 (46.2)	14.4 (57.9)
Mean daily minimum °C (°F)	2.1 (35.8)	2.2 (36.0)	3.4 (38.1)	5.1 (41.2)	7.7 (45.9)	10.5 (50.9)	12.7 (54.9)	12.5 (54.5)	10.5 (50.9)	7.8 (46.0)	4.6 (40.3)	2.4 (36.3)	6.85 (44.33)
Average precipitation mm (inches)	54.3 (2.14)	47.6 (1.87)	43.3 (1.70)	47.5 (1.87)	48.3 (1.90)	69.7 (2.74)	61.3 (2.41)	64.6 (2.54)	61.3 (2.41)	66.4 (2.61)	68.2 (2.69)	60.4 (2.38)	693.4 (27.30)
Average precipitation days (≥ 1.0 mm)	11.7	10.4	9.8	9.5	9.3	9.8	9.7	10.1	9.1	11.2	12.6	11.7	124.8
Mean monthly sunshine hours	55.4	79.0	117.6	159.1	200.1	189.3	197.0	183.2	147.3	109.2	65.7	55.3	1,558.7
Source: Met Office

== Demography ==
Population pyramid of Kingston upon Hull (unitary authority) in 2021

Population growth in Kingston upon Hull since 1801
Year	Population
1801	21,280
1811	28,040
1821	33,393
1831	40,902
1841	57,342
1851	57,484
1861	93,955
1871	130,426
1881	166,896
1891	199,134
1901	236,722
1911	281,525
1921	295,017
1931	309,158
1941	302,074^{[a]}
1951	295,172
1961	289,716
1971	284,365
1981	266,751
1991	254,117
2001	243,595^{[c]}^{[d]}
2011	256,406
2021	267,014

According to the 2001 UK census, Hull had a population of 243,589 living in 104,288 households. The population density was 34.1 per hectare. Of the total number of homes 47.85% were rented compared with a national figure of 31.38% rented. The population had declined by 7.5% since the 1991 UK census, and has been officially estimated as 256,200 in July 2006.

In 2001, approximately 53,000 people were aged under 16, 174,000 were aged 16–74, and 17,000 aged 75 and over. Of the total population 97.7% were white and the largest minority ethnic group was of 749 people who considered themselves to be ethnically Chinese. There were 3% of people living in Hull who were born outside the United Kingdom. In 2006, the largest minority ethnic grouping was Iraqi Kurds who were estimated at 3,000. Most of these people were placed in the city by the Home Office while their applications for asylum were being processed. In 2001, the city was 71.7% Christian. A further 18% of the population indicated they were of no religion while 8.4% did not specify any religious affiliation.

Historically, minorities of many faiths and nationalities have lived around the docks, Old Town and City Centre, coming in from European ports like Hamburg, aided by continental railways and steam-ships from the mid-1800s. Over 2 million passed through Hull between 1850 and 1914, on the way to a new life in America and elsewhere, but some planned or decided to stay. Dutch, Jews, Germans, Scandinavians and others were sometimes prominently involved in the life of the port city. They found opportunity but endured discrimination at times, such that these communities have now largely dispersed.

Also in 2001, the city had a high proportion, at 6.2%, of people of working age who were unemployed, ranking 354th out of 376 local and unitary authorities within England and Wales. The distance travelled to work was less than 3 miles (4.8 km) for 64,578 out of 95,957 employed people. A further 18,031 travelled between 3.1 and 6.2 miles (5 and 10 km) to their place of employment. The number of people using public transport to get to work was 12,915 while the number travelling by car was 53,443.

Men in the University Ward had the fourth lowest life expectancy at birth, 69.4 years, of any ward in England and Wales in 2016.

=== Ethnicity ===
Ethnic Group	Year							
Ethnic Group	1991		2001		2011		2021	
Ethnic Group	Number	%	Number	%	Number	%	Number	%
White: Total	250,934	98.7%	237,939	97.7%	241,321	94.1%	244,989	91.8%
White: British	–	–	234,716	96.4%	229,920	89.7%	223,962	83.9%
White: Irish	–	–	761		550		455	0.2%
White: Gypsy or Irish Traveller	–	–	–	–	284		451	0.2%
White: Roma							286	0.1%
White: Other	–	–	2,462		10,567		19,835	7.4%
Asian or Asian British: Total	1,644	0.6%	2,656	1.1%	6,471	2.5%	7,515	2.9%
Asian or Asian British: Indian	318		613		1,086		1,259	0.5%
Asian or Asian British: Pakistani	237		509		882		1,292	0.5%
Asian or Asian British: Bangladeshi	235		387		755		1,279	0.5%
Asian or Asian British: Chinese	537		749		2,124		1,234	0.5%
Asian or Asian British: Other Asian	317		398		1,624		2,451	0.9%
Black or Black British: Total	862	0.3%	872	0.4%	2,996	1.2%	5,065	1.9%
Black or Black British: African	356		640		2,472		4,292	1.6%
Black or Black British: Caribbean	137		155		236		232	0.1%
Black or Black British: Other Black	369		77		288		541	0.2%
Mixed or British Mixed: Total	–	–	1,619	0.7%	3,454	1.3%	4,513	1.7%
Mixed: White and Black Caribbean	–	–	340		871		948	0.4%
Mixed: White and Black African	–	–	338		821		1,144	0.4%
Mixed: White and Asian	–	–	453		945		1,172	0.4%
Mixed: Other Mixed	–	–	488		817		1,249	0.5%
Other: Total	677	0.3%	503	0.2%	2,164	0.8%	4,931	1.8%
Other: Arab	–	–	–	–	1,134		1,443	0.5%
Other: Any other ethnic group	677	0.3%	503	0.2%	1,030		3,488	1.3%
Total	254,117	100%	243,589	100%	256,406	100%	267,013	100%

== Industry ==
The traditional industries of Hull are seafaring (whaling and later seafishing) and later heavy industry which both have since declined in the city. Companies BP and Reckitt Benckiser, have facilities in Hull. The city is part of the Humber Enterprise Zone.

=== Port ===
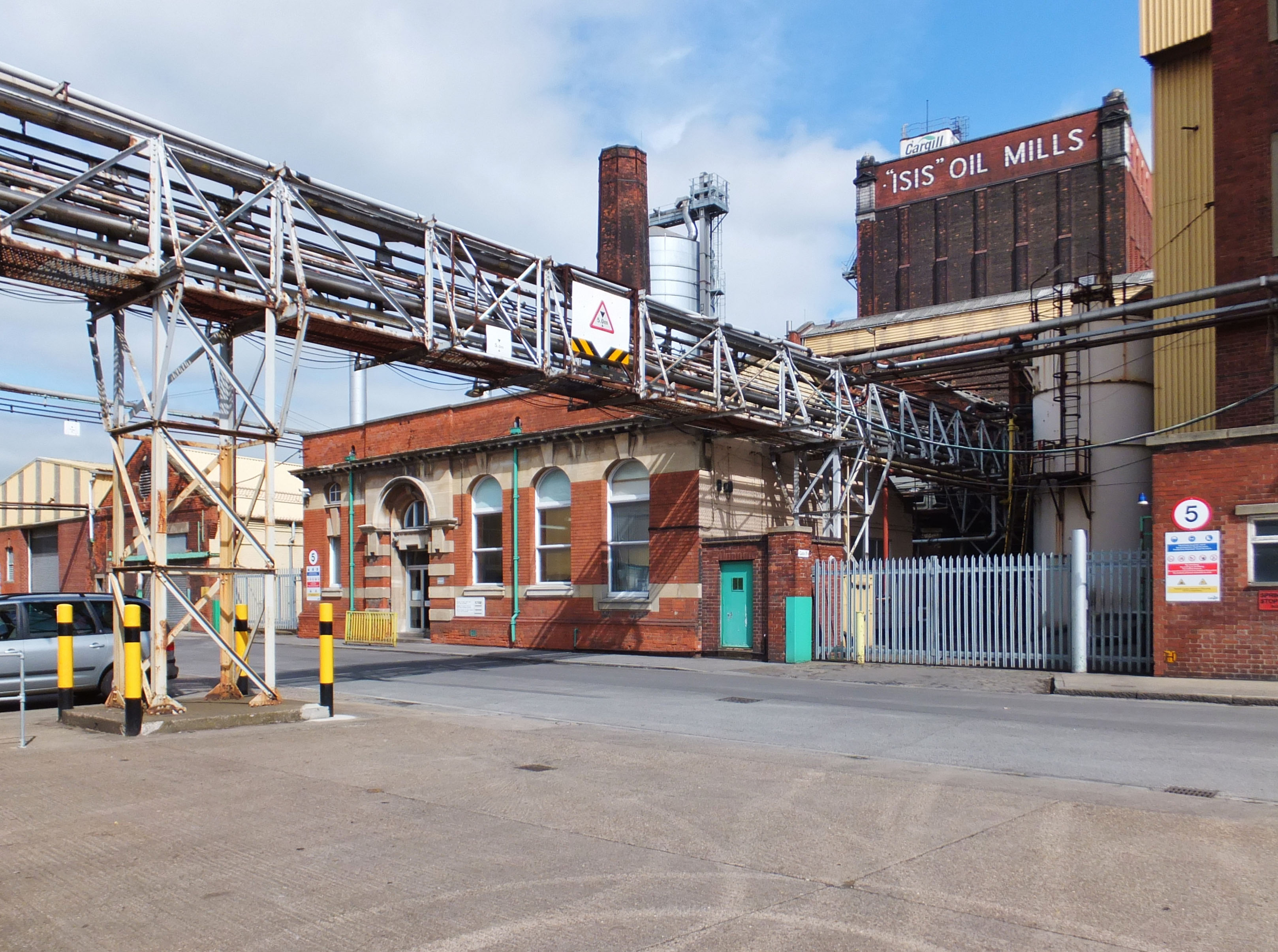
The Isis Oil Mill Complex, now owned by Cargill

Although the fishing industry, including oilseed production, declined in the 1970s due to the Cod Wars, the city remains a busy port, handling 13 million tonnes of cargo per year. The port operations run by Associated British Ports and other companies in the port employ 5,000 people. A further 18,000 are employed as a direct result of the port's activities. The port freight railway line, the Hull Docks Branch, operates 22 trains per day.

=== Energy ===
In January 2011 Siemens Wind Power and Associated British Ports signed a memorandum of understanding concerning the construction of a wind turbine blade manufacturing plant at Alexander Dock. The plan would require some modification of the dock to allow the ships, used for transporting the wind turbine blades, to dock and be loaded. Planning applications for the plant were submitted in December 2011, and affirmed in 2014, concerning 75-metre (246 ft) blades for the 6 MW offshore model. A 12.5-acre (5.1 ha) site waste-to-energy centre costing in the region of £150 million is also planned to be built by the Spencer Group. Announced in mid-2011, and named 'Energy Works', the proposed plant would process up to 200,000 tonnes of organic material per year, with energy produced via a waste gasification process. Commissioning of the plant was undertaken in 2019 with full operation expected to be late 2019.

=== Other ===
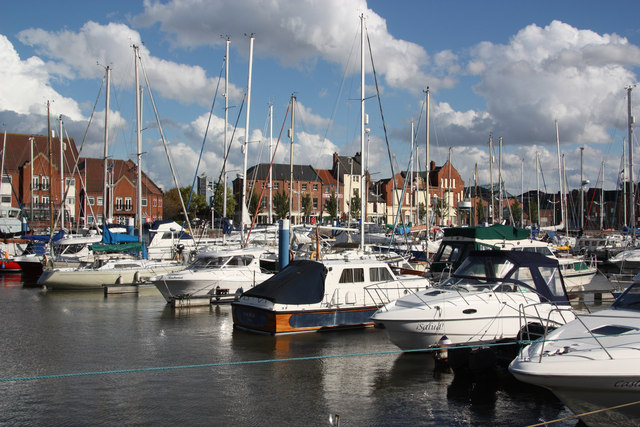
Hull Marina

Hull Marina was developed on land formerly occupied by the railway docks in the centre of the city. It was rebuilt and opened in 1983, it has 270 berths for yachts and small sailing craft.

In July 2014, the former Fruit Market was demolished with a technology hub C4DI (Centre for Digital Innovation) built in December 2015.

The city has chemical and health care sectors, Smith & Nephew's founder Thomas James Smith being from the city. The health care sector has research facilities provided by the University of Hull through the Institute of Woundcare and the Hull York Medical School partnerships.

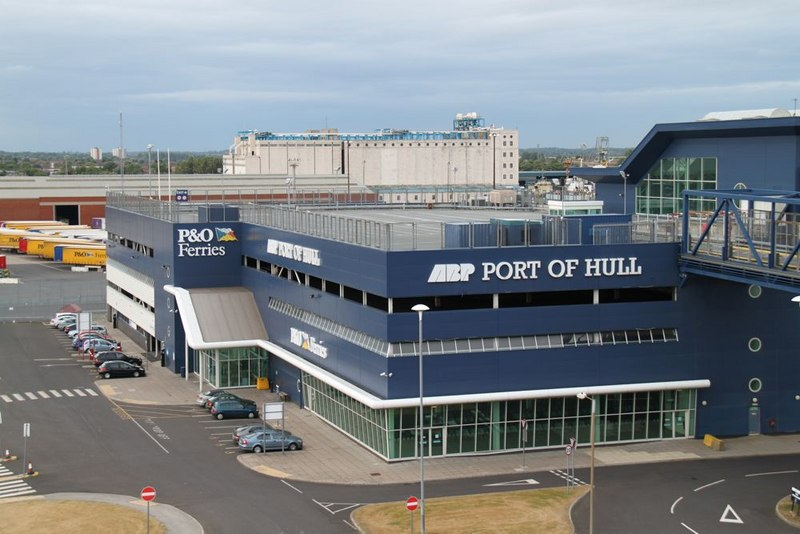
Port of Hull Ferry Terminal

Ferry services started after the decline in fishing by the introduction of Roll-on Roll-off ferry services to the continent of Europe. These ferries handle over a million passengers each year.

== Commerce ==
=== Trade ===
Merchant's houses such as Blaydes House and some warehouses survive in the Old Town, where trade was centred on the River Hull, later shifting to the Humber docks.

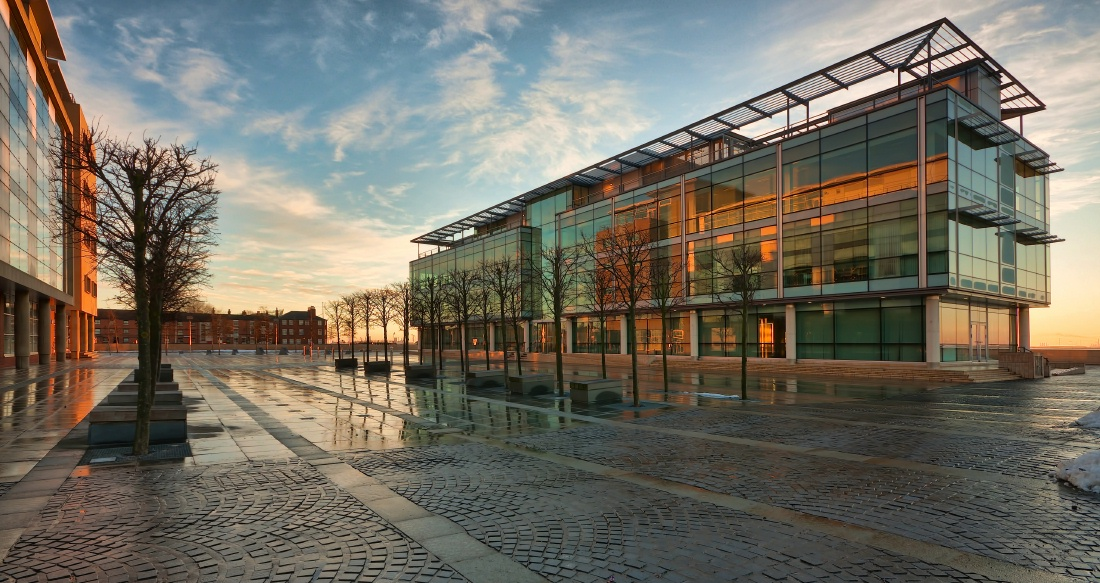
One Humber Quays

Humber Quays incorporates the World Trade Centre Hull & Humber and offices for The Spencer Group, RBS, and Jonathan Oliver Lee. The quays was a late 2000s development costing £165 million with office buildings, housing, a 200-bedroom hotel and a restaurant.

=== Retail ===
In March 2017, the Old Town area was designated as one of 10 Heritage Action Zones by Historic England with the benefit that the area would get a share of £6 million. Retailers such as Heron Foods, and Jacksons began their operations in Hull. The former electrical retailer Comet was founded in the city as Comet Battery Stores Limited in 1933; the company's first superstore was opened in Hull in 1968.

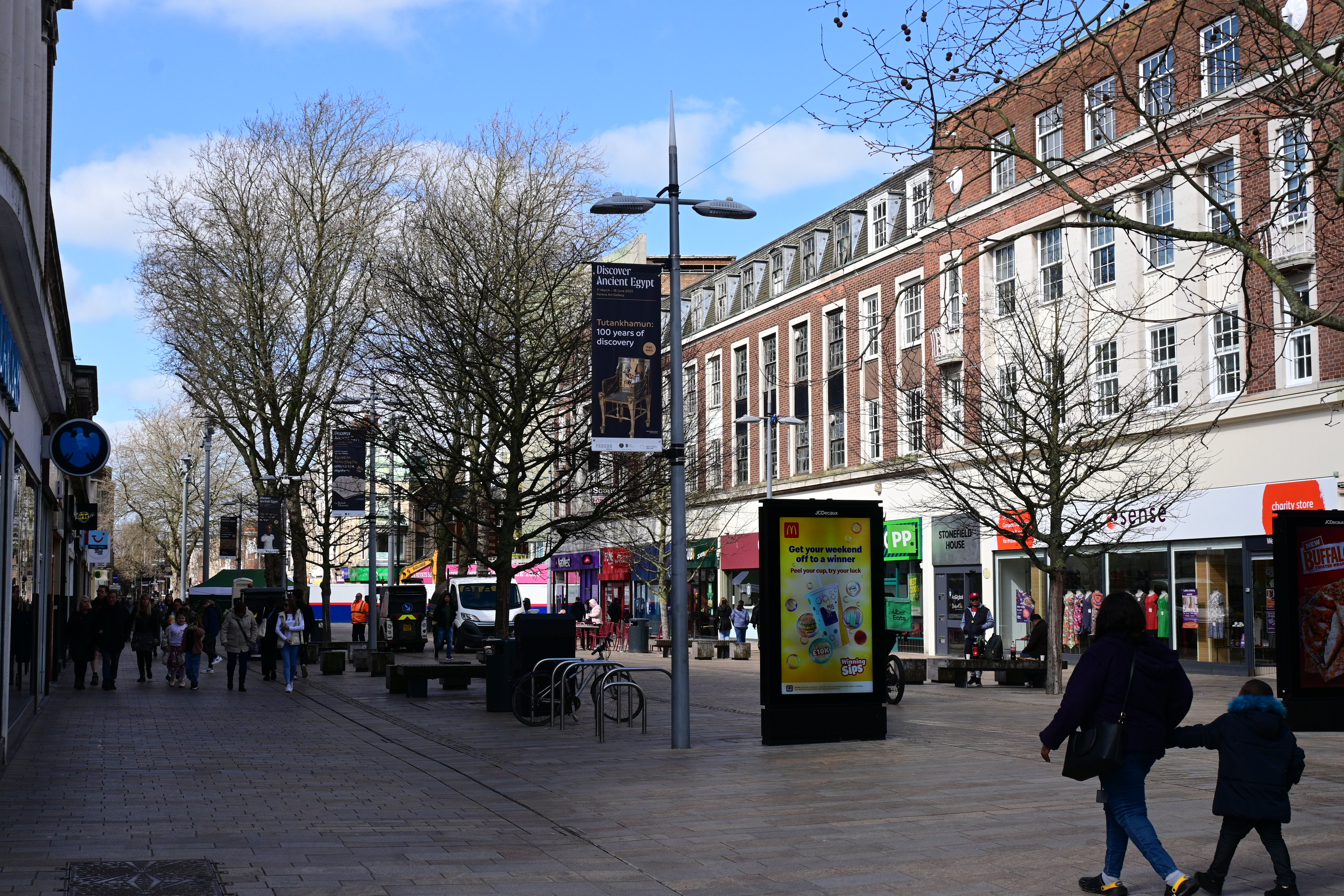
King Edward Street

Hull has many shopping streets, both inside and outside the city centre. The main non-city-centre shopping streets are Hessle Road, Holderness Road, Chanterlands Avenue, Beverley Road, Princes Avenue, and Newland Avenue.

Trinity Market Hall

Additionally, two covered shopping arcades, Paragon and Hepworth. The latter was modernised and renovated in the late 2000s. The city also has the Trinity Market Hall, a grade II listed building Edwardian era indoor hall with 50 stalls, it was last renovated in 2016.

The city centre has three shopping centres, St Stephen's, Princes Quay, and the Prospect Centre. The Prospect Centre on Prospect Street is the smaller and older shopping centre which benefits from large footfall; having chain stores, banks, fashion retailers and the city's main post office.

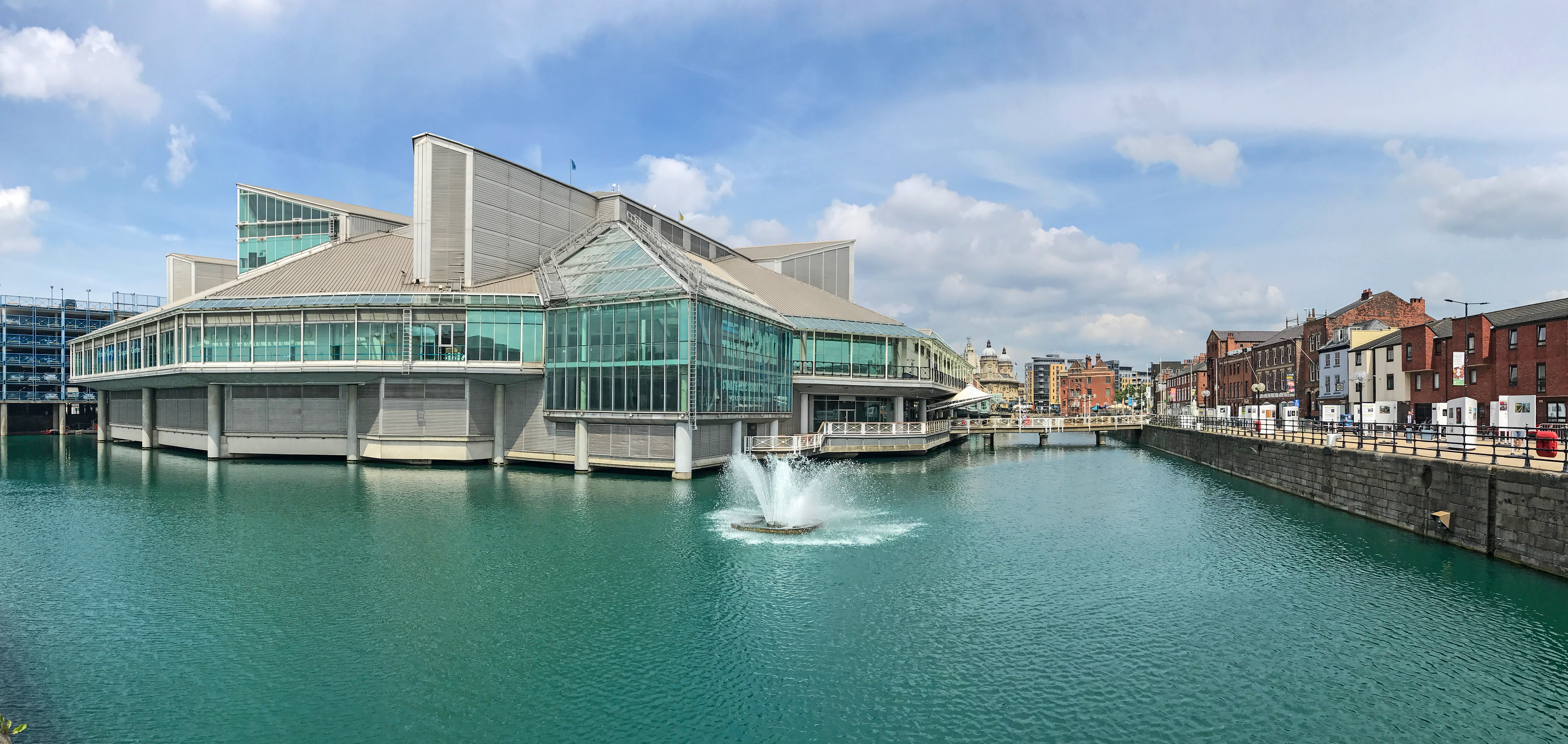
Prince's Quay Shopping Centre built over Prince's Dock

Princes Quay Shopping Centre was built in 1991 on stilts over the closed Prince's Dock. It has a mixture of chain stores and food outlets. It was built with four retail floors, known as "decks", with the uppermost deck converted to a cinema from December 2007.

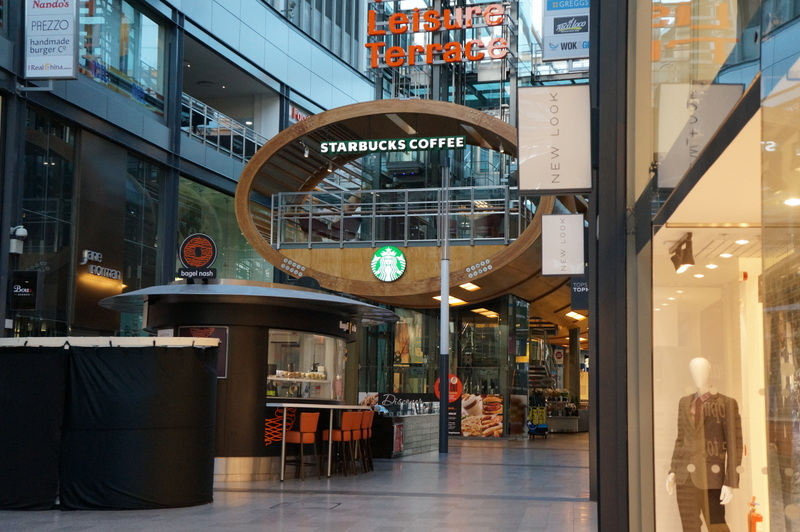
St Stephens Shopping Centre, Hull

The St Stephen's shopping centre development on Ferensway adjacent to Hull Paragon Interchange is a 560,000-square-foot (52,000 m^{2}) scheme, that opened in 2007. It is anchored by a superstore and provides many shop units, food outlets, a hotel, and a 7-screen cinema. Since its opening, shopping patterns within the city centre have shifted to the centre from around Princes Quay.

The North Point Shopping Centre, also known as Bransholme Shopping Centre which is the area of the city where it is located, contains a similar range of popular chain and budget retailers including Boyes and Heron Foods. There are also other outer centres for shopping and retail parks, including St Andrews Quay retail park on the Humber bank and Kingswood retail park (Kingswood).

=== Nightlife, bars and pubs ===
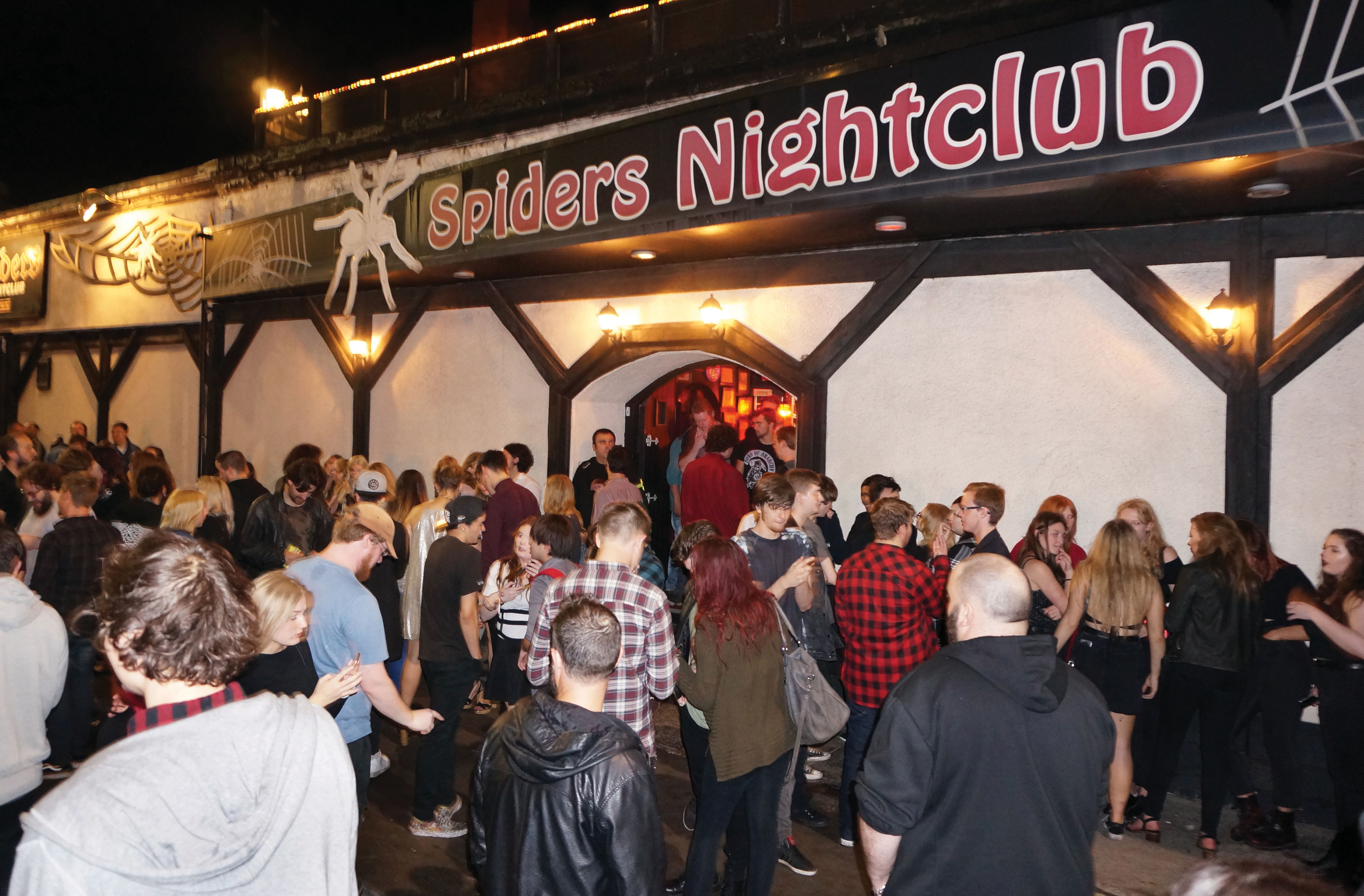
Spiders Nightclub, first opened in 1979

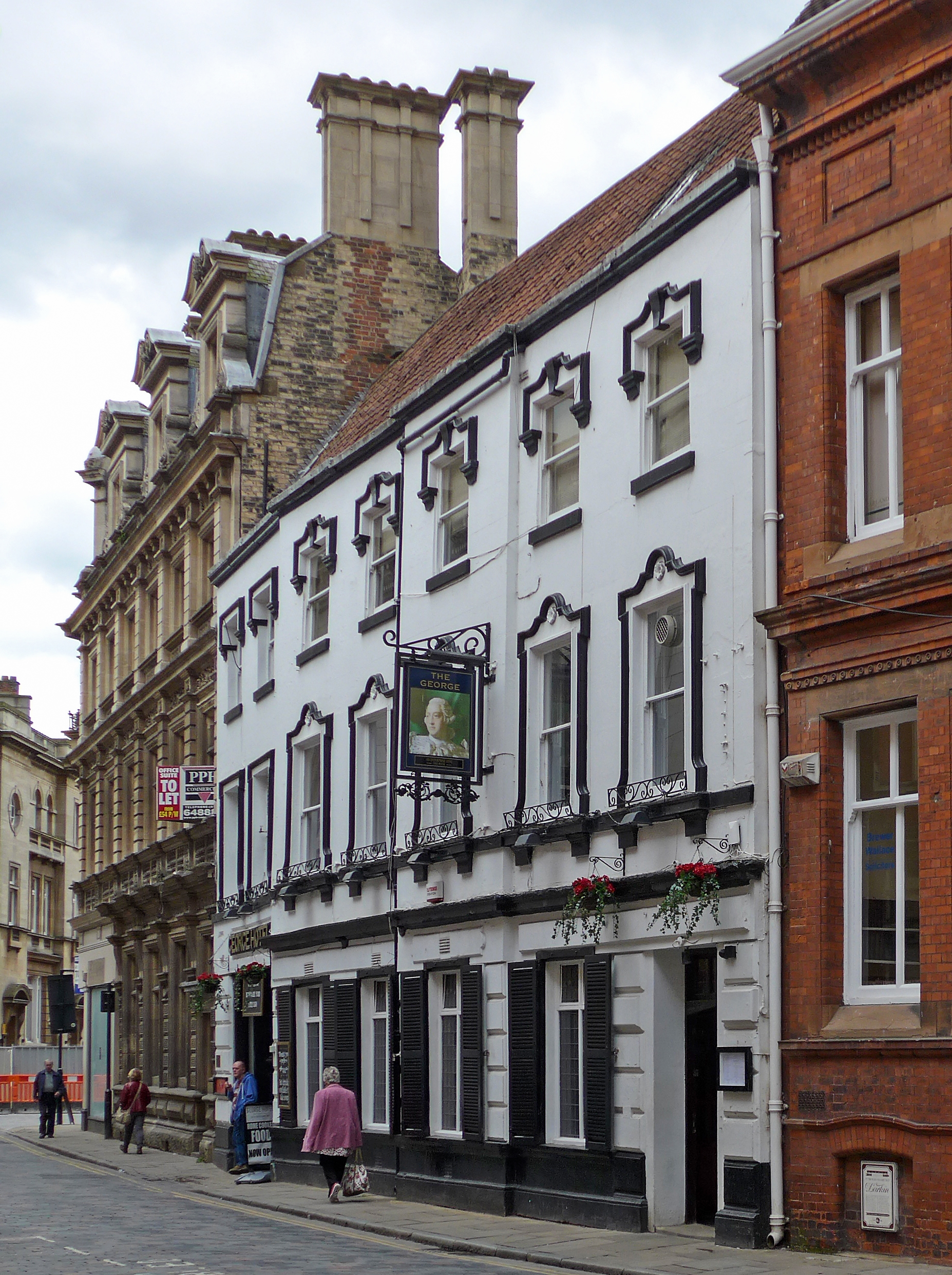
The George Hotel in the city centre

The main drinking area in the city centre is the Old Town. One pub has Hull's smallest window (The George Hotel).

Spiders, which opened in 1979, is an alternative rock nightclub on Cleveland Street, situated in a building that was once The Hope and Anchor pub.

'ATIK' nightclub (formerly The Sugarmill) is situated adjacent to Princes Quay shopping centre and the historic Princes Dock which dated back to 1829.

== Culture ==
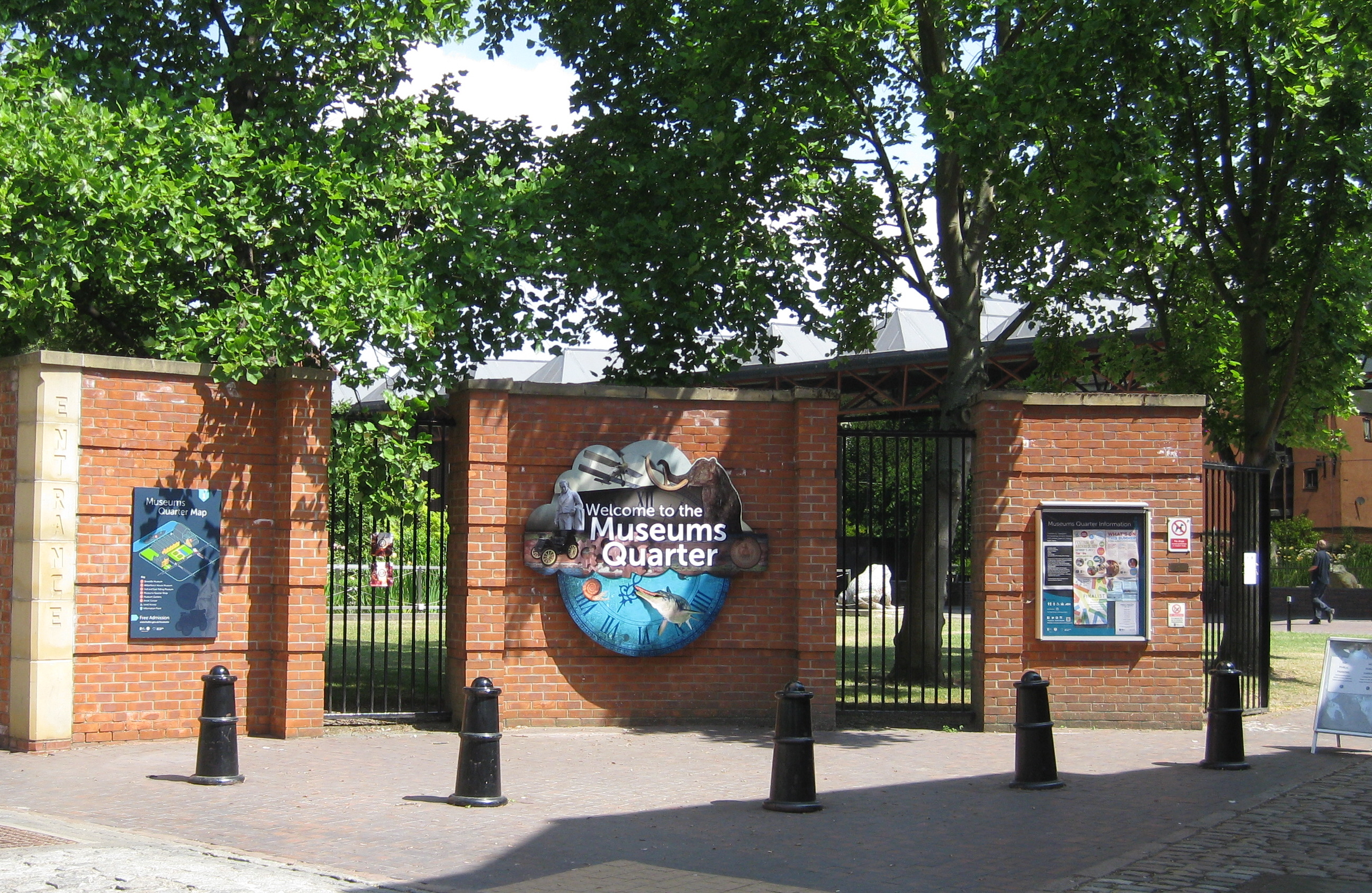
Museums Quarter corner of garden

Hull has several museums of national importance. The city has a theatrical tradition with some famous actors and writers having been born and lived in Hull. The city's arts and heritage have played a role in attracting visitors and encouraging tourism in recent efforts at regeneration. Hull has a diverse range of architecture and this is complemented by parks and squares and a number of statues and modern sculptures. The city has inspired author Val Wood who has set many of her best-selling novels in the city. The Wilberforce Lecture and award of the Wilberforce Medallion, which has taken place annually since 1995, celebrates the historic role of Hull and William Wilberforce in combating the abuse of human rights.

In April 2013 Hull put forward a bid to be the UK City of Culture in 2017, reaching the shortlist of four in June 2013 along with Dundee, Leicester and Swansea Bay. On 20 November 2013, Maria Miller, the Culture Secretary, announced that Hull had won the award to become the UK City of Culture 2017.

Monopoly have released a version focusing on Hull, with attractions such as the Deep and St Stephens included.

=== Museums ===
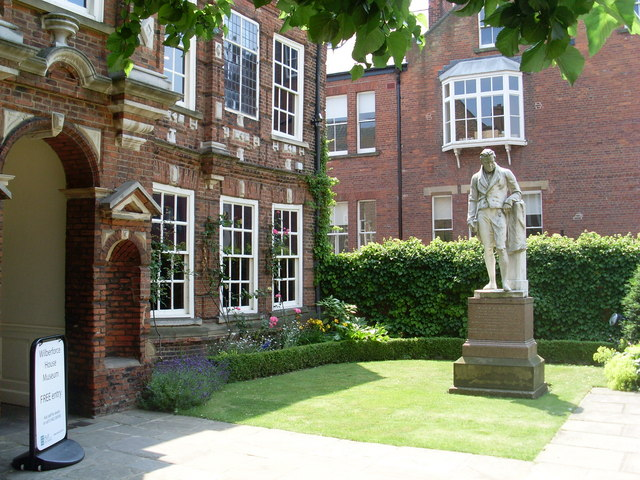
Wilberforce House, home of the museum dedicated to William Wilberforce

The Museums Quarter is a development on the High Street in the heart of the Old Town. It combines four museums around a leisure garden. The work cost £5.1 million and was carried out from 1998 to 2003, being formally opened by the Duke of Gloucester.

The Museums are Wilberforce House, the birthplace of William Wilberforce (1759–1833), the British politician, abolitionist and social reformer; the Arctic Corsair, a deep-sea trawler that was converted to a museum ship in 1999, on the adjacent River Hull; the Hull and East Riding Museum, showing the archaeology and history of the region; and the Streetlife Museum of Transport, which includes a sizeable collection of vintage cars, preserved public transport vehicles and horse-drawn carriages.

Other museums include the Hull Maritime Museum in Victoria Square, the Spurn Lightship, and The Deep, a public aquarium.

=== Art and galleries ===
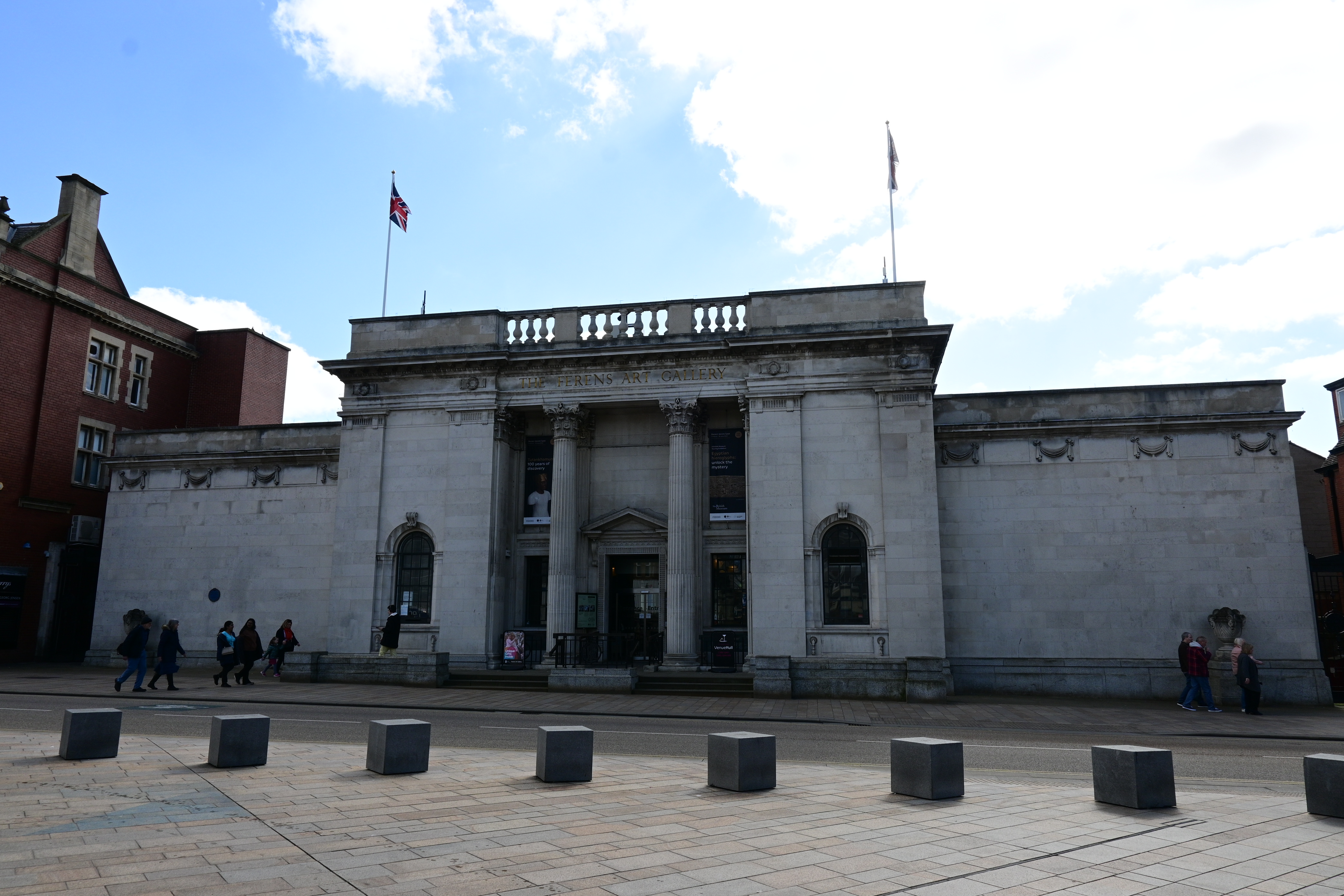
Ferens Art Gallery

The civic art gallery is the Ferens Art Gallery on Queen Victoria Square, a Grade II listed building. It is named after Thomas Ferens who provided the funds for it. Other galleries include the three-storey Humber Street Gallery, in the former Fruit Market building which was opened in 2017 as part of Hull City of Culture. There are other smaller exhibition spaces.

==== Creations ====
Marine painter John Ward (1798–1849) was born, worked and died in Hull and a leading ship artist of his day. Artist and Royal Academician David Remfry (born 1942) grew up in Hull and studied at the Hull College of Art (now part of Lincoln University) from 1959 to 1964. His tutor, Gerald T Harding, trained at the Royal College of Art, London and was awarded the Abbey Minor Travelling Scholarship in 1957 by the British School in Rome. Remfry has had two solo exhibitions at the Ferens Art Gallery in 1975 and 2005.

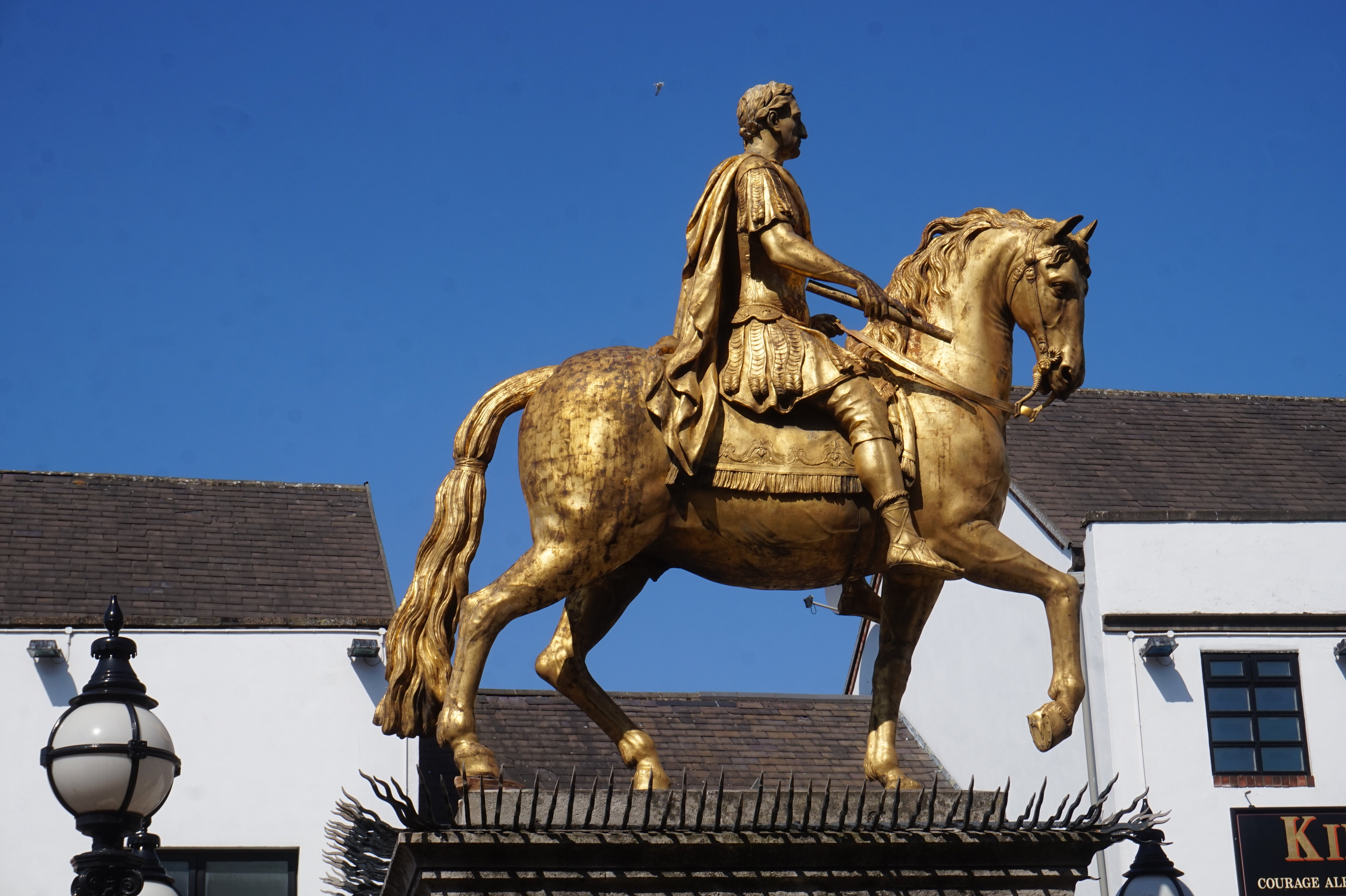
King Billy Statue

Hull has a number of historical statues such as the Wilberforce Memorial in Queen's Gardens and the gilded King William III statue on Market Place (known locally as "King Billy"). There is a statue of Hull-born Amy Johnson in Prospect Street and Hull's Paragon Interchange has a statue of Philip Larkin, the latter unveiled on 2 December 2010.

In 2010 a public art event in Hull city centre entitled Larkin with Toads displayed 40 individually decorated giant toad models as the centrepiece of the Larkin 25 festival. Most of these sculptures have since been sold off for charity and transported to their new owners.

In recent years a number of modern art sculptures and heritage trails have been installed around Hull. These include a figure looking out to the Humber called 'Voyage' which has a twin in Iceland. In July 2011, this artwork was reported stolen. There is a shark sculpture outside The Deep and a fountain and installation called 'Tower of Light' outside Britannia House on the corner of Spring Bank.

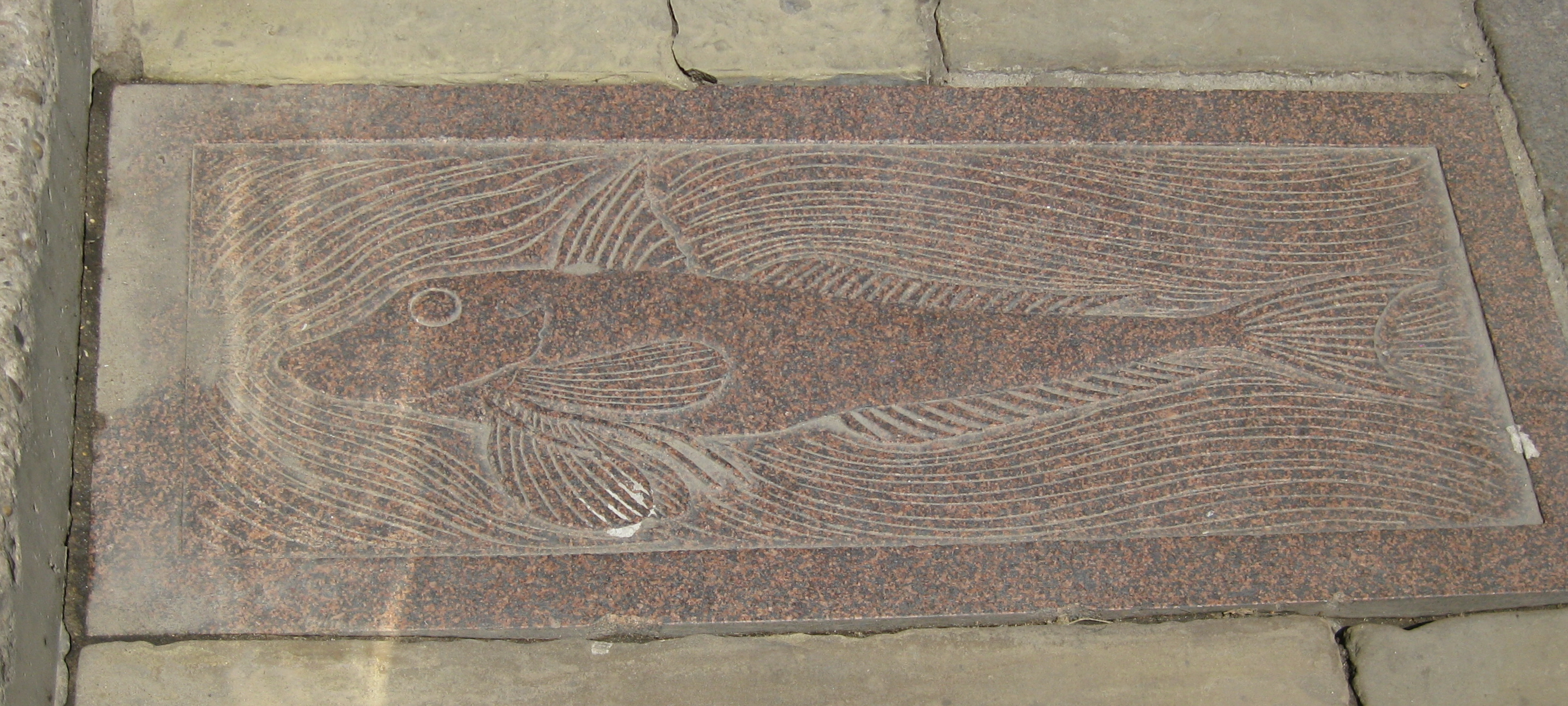
Part of the Seven Seas Fish Trail, on Lowgate

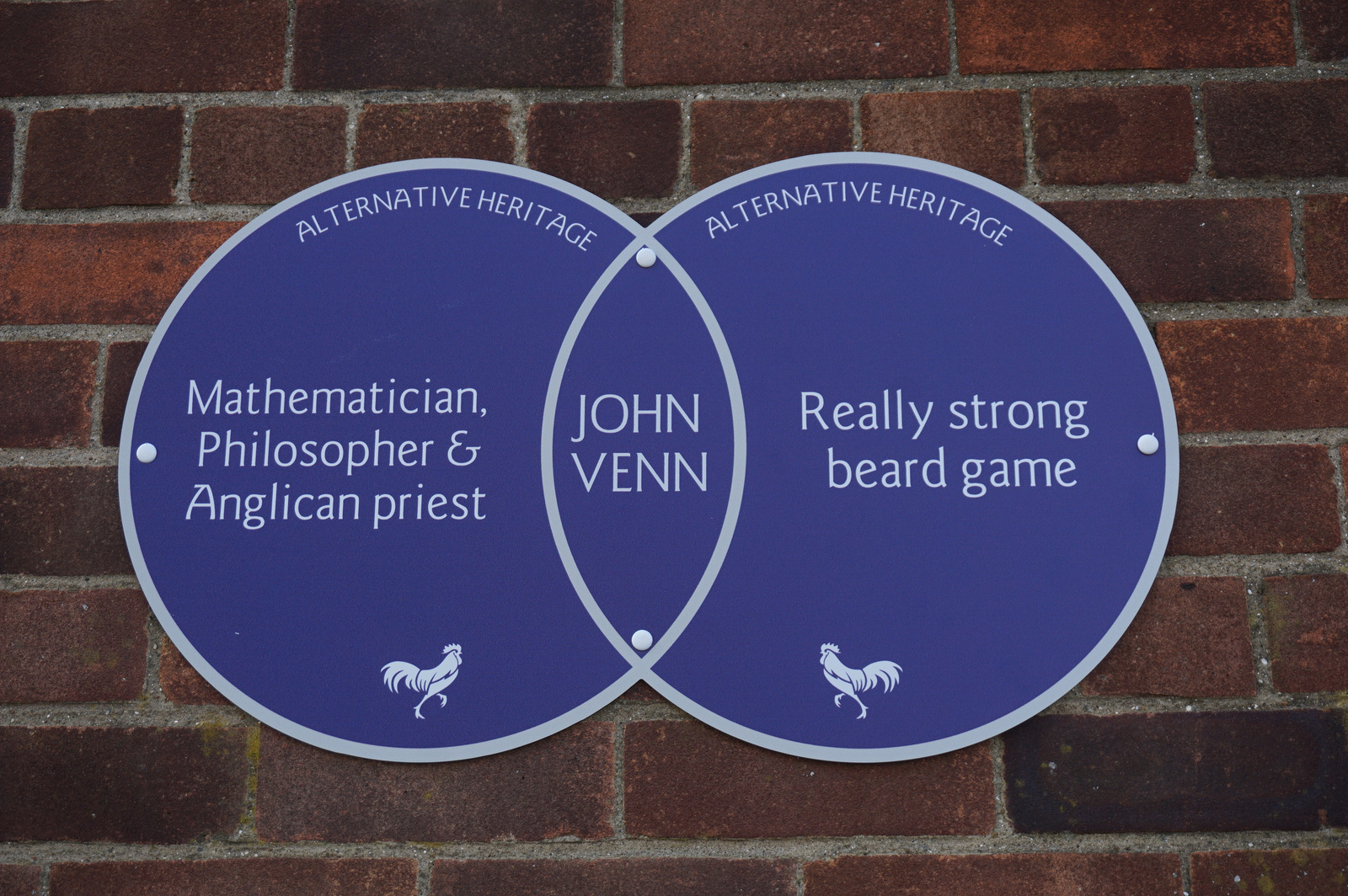
Alternative Heritage Blue Plaque to John Venn

The Seven Seas Fish Trail marks Hull's fishing heritage, leading its followers through old and new sections of the city, following a wide variety of sealife engraved in the pavement. Running along Spring Bank there is also an elephant trail, with stone pavers carved by a local artist to the designs of members of the community. This trail commemorates the Victorian Zoological Gardens and the route taken daily by the elephant as it walked from its house down Spring Bank to the zoo and back, stopping for gingerbread at a shop on the way. The animals are further represented on the Albany Street 'Home Zone' a project involving local residents and resulting in sculptures of a hippo ('Water Horse') at the bottom of Albany Street; an elephant balancing on its trunk on an island in the middle; and two bears climbing poles and reaching out to each other to form an open archway across the entrance to Albany Street from Spring Bank. Other sculptural details of animals along the street represent the participation of street residents, either through workshops with artists and makers, or through independent work of their own.

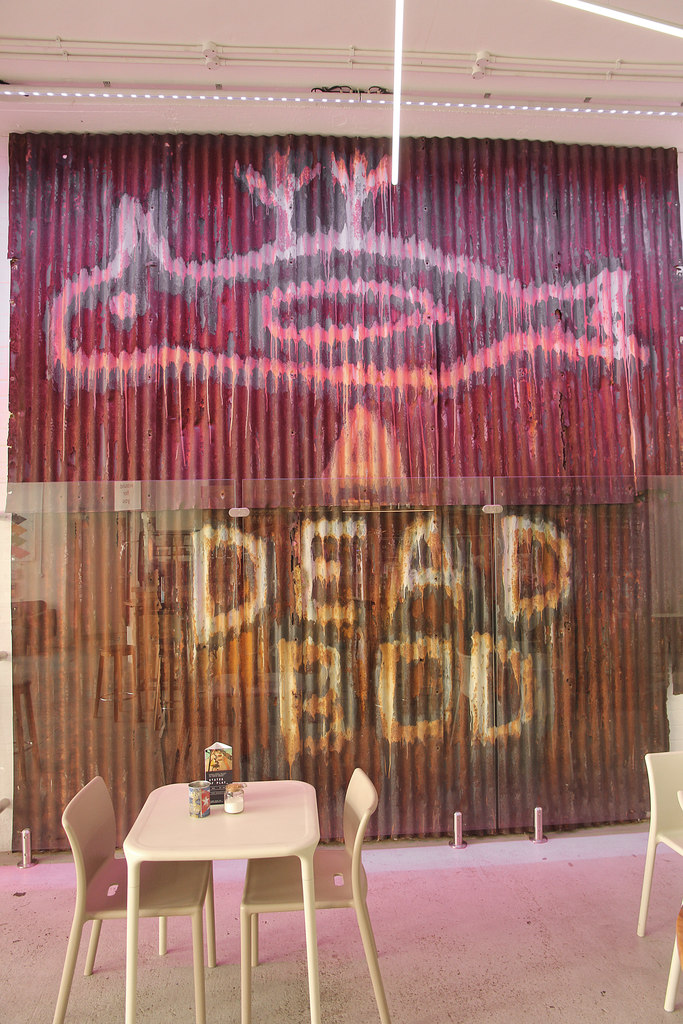
Dead Bod in the Humber Street Gallery

In 2019 a series of blue plaques appeared around Hull as part of the Alternative Heritage project. The art project was designed to celebrate the little known and quirky facts that make Hull the city it is. A variety of tongue in cheek and humorous blue plaques appeared over night celebrating everything from Chip Spice to James Venn to The Beautiful South. New plaques continue to appear on a regular basis and their content has occasionally divided opinion in the city.

The "Dead Bod", a graffito originally painted on the Alexandria Dock, became a local landmark. It is now located in the Humber Street Gallery.

==== Three Ships mural ====
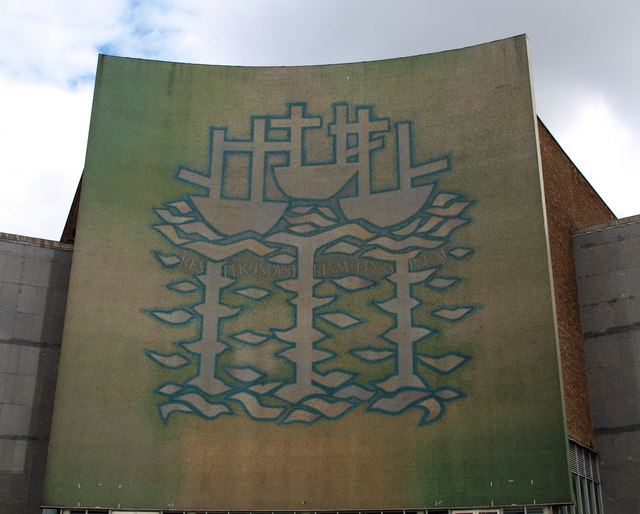
Three Ships mosaic mural on the old Co-Op building

The mural is on a curved screen attached to the end-wall of the old city centre Co-operative store building sited at the intersection where Jameson Street meets King Edward Street, now a mainly pedestrianised area created for the City of Culture 2017.

Built by 1963 and later home to BHS, the building closed in 2016 with the collapse of BHS retail stores and was scheduled for demolition due to asbestos content. The building was listed as Grade II after lobbying by local pressure group Hull Heritage Action Group, potentially preventing demolition of the mural-wall. Specialist spraying to seal the building's internal structure has enabled moves to determine the actual level of asbestos in the mural-wall itself and provided a possible solution to incorporate the wall into a new development.

=== Theatres ===
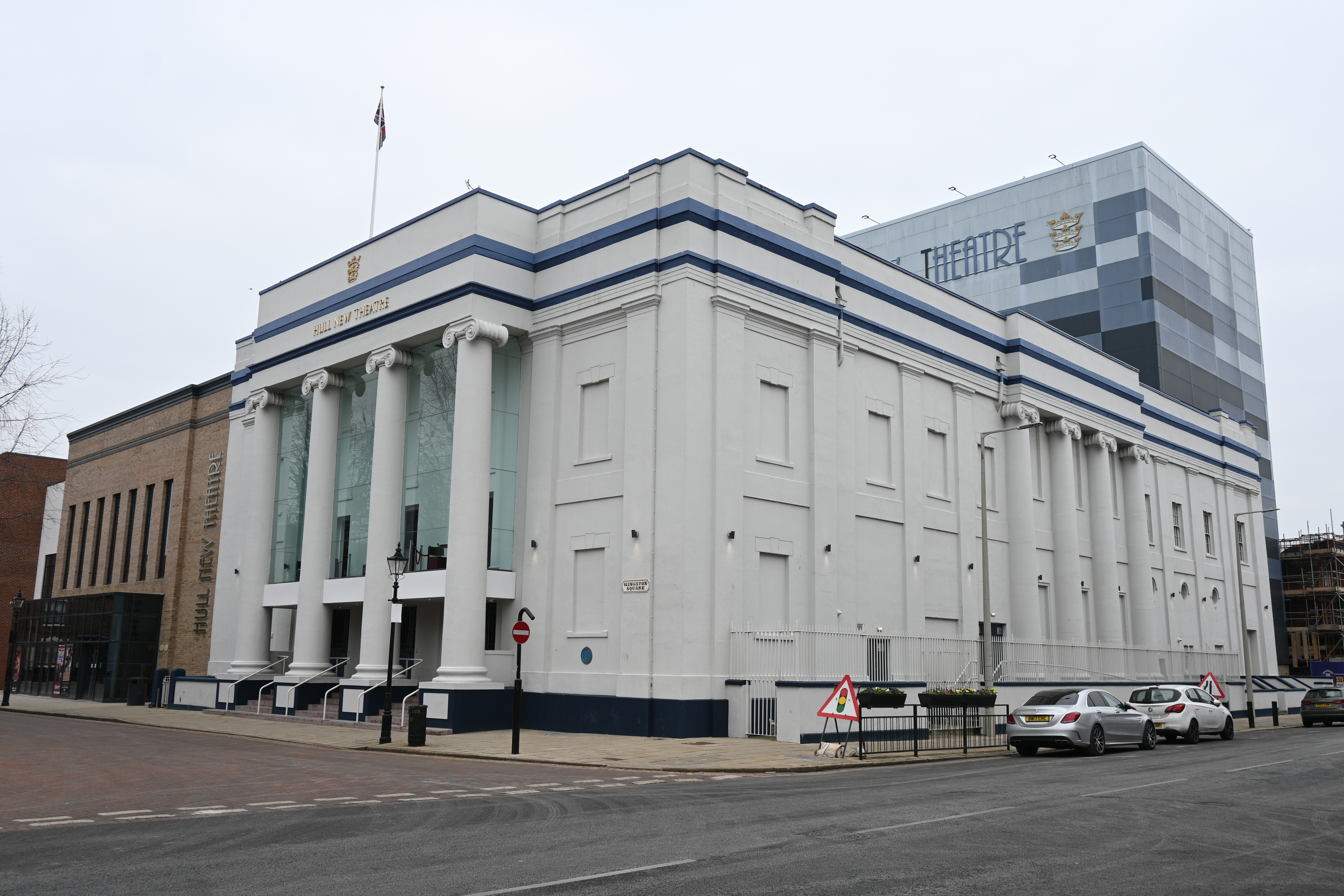
Hull New Theatre

The city has two main theatres. Hull New Theatre, which opened in 1939, with a £16 million refurbishment in 2016–17, is the largest venue which features musicals, opera, ballet, drama, children's shows and pantomime. The Hull Truck Theatre is a smaller independent theatre, established in 1971, that regularly features plays, notably those written by John Godber. Since April 2009, the Hull Truck Theatre has had a new £14.5 million, 440 seat venue in the St Stephen's Hull development. This replaced the former home of the Hull Truck Theatre on Spring Street, a complex of buildings demolished in 2011. The playwright Alan Plater was brought up in Hull and was associated with Hull Truck Theatre.

Hull has produced several veteran stage and TV actors. Sir Tom Courtenay, Ian Carmichael and Maureen Lipman were born and brought up in Hull. Younger actors Reece Shearsmith and Debra Stephenson were also born in Hull.

In 1914, there were 29 cinemas in Hull but most of these have now closed. The first purpose-built cinema was the Prince's Hall in George Street which was opened in 1910 by Hull's theatre magnate, William Morton. It was subsequently renamed the Curzon.

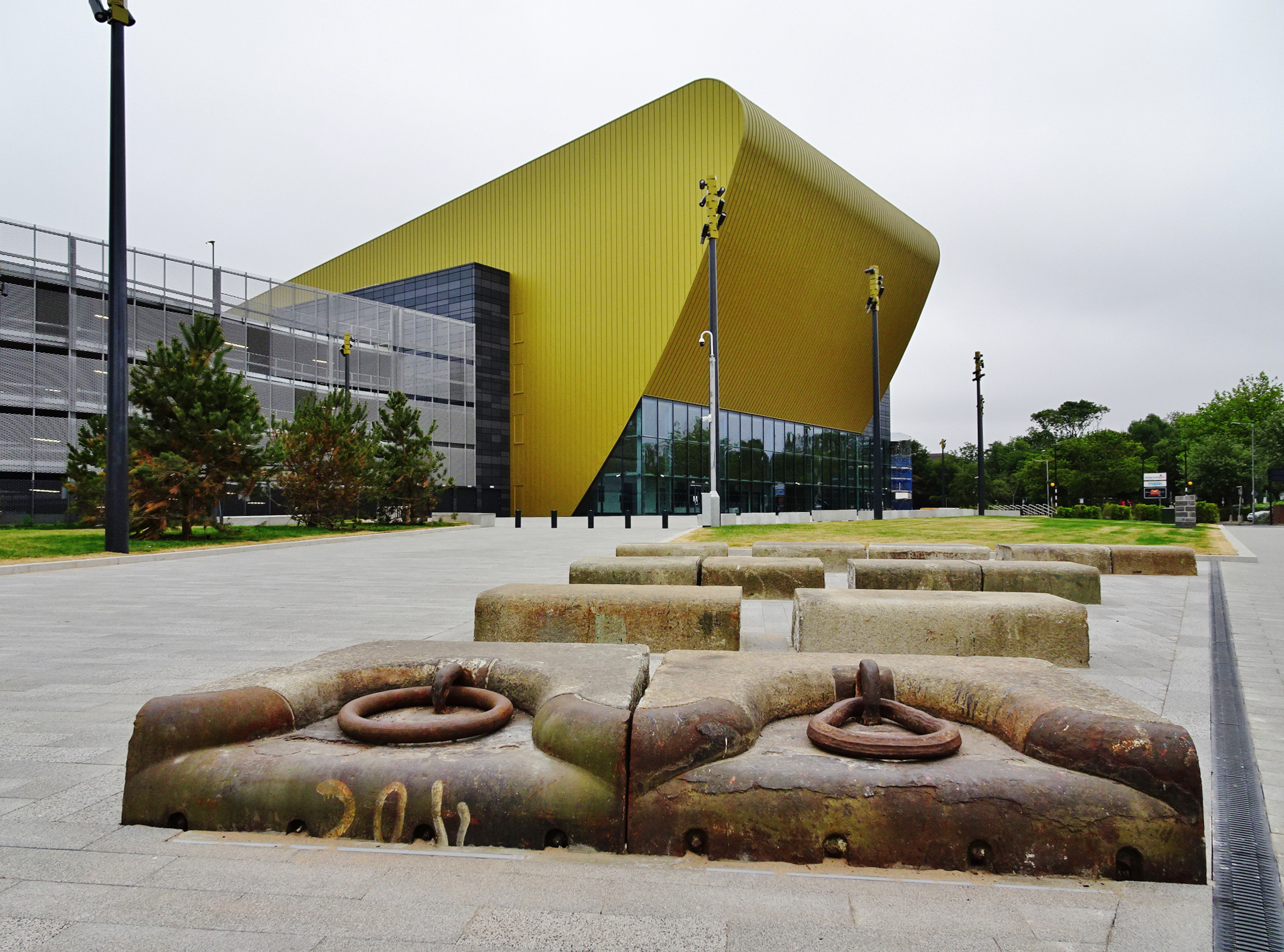
Connexin Live Arena, opened July 2018 as the Bonus Arena

On 25 July 2018, Connexin Live Arena (originally Bonus Arena), a new 3,000 seat arena was opened to the public in the centre of the city. It was officially opened on 20 August 2018, with a Van Morrison concert.

=== Festivals ===
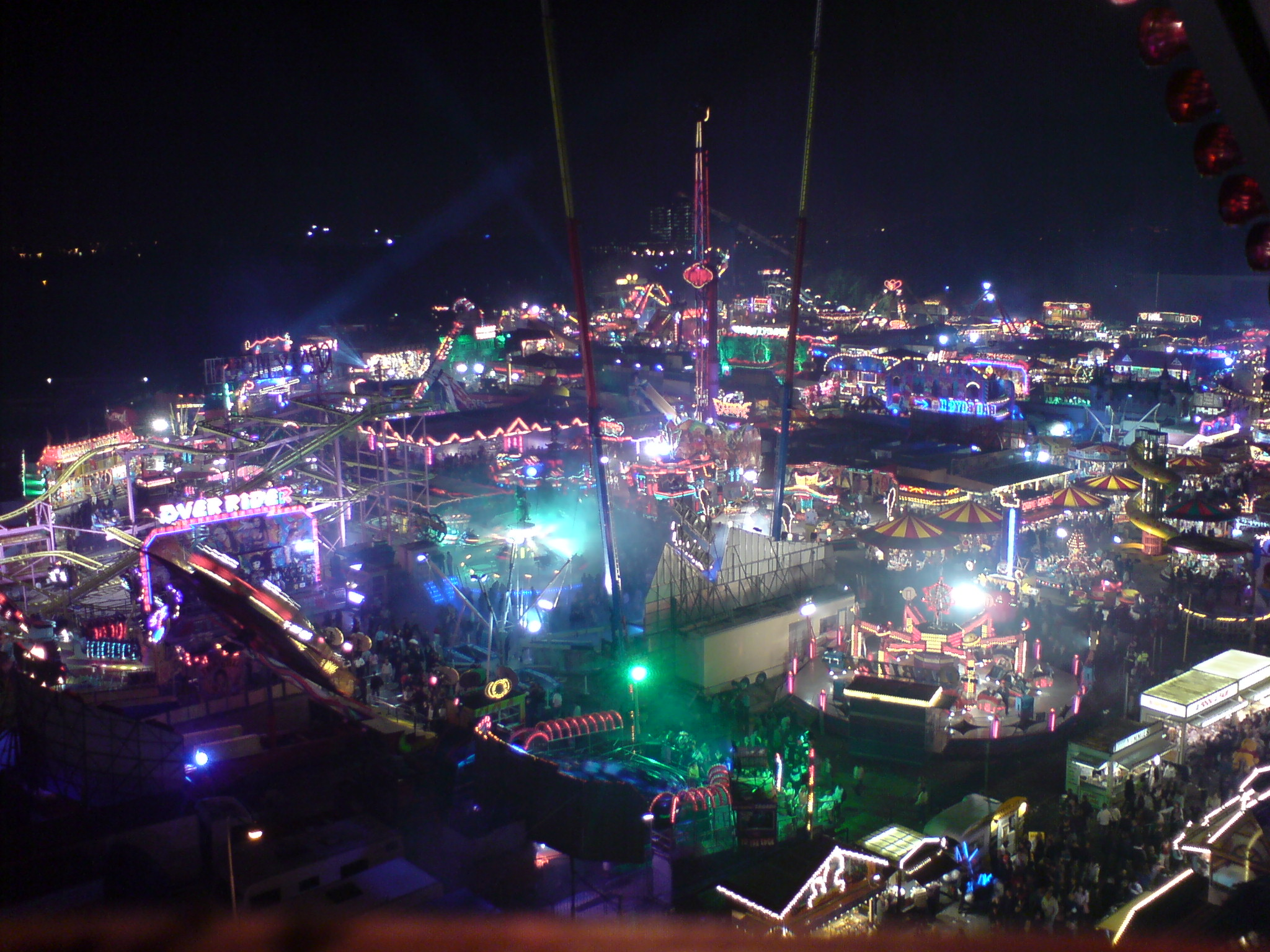
Hull Fair taken from the top of the Big Wheel, 2006

The Humber Mouth literature festival is an annual event and the 2012 season featured artists such as John Cooper Clarke, Kevin MacNeil and Miriam Margolyes. The annual Hull Jazz Festival takes place around the Marina area for a week at the beginning of August.

From 2008 Hull has also held its Freedom Festival, an annual free arts and live music event that celebrates freedom in all its forms. Performers have included Pixie Lott, JLS and Martha Reeves and The Vandellas, Public Service Broadcasting and The 1975 as well as featuring a torchlight procession, local bands like The Talks and Happy Endings from Fruit Trade Music label and a Ziggy Stardust photo exhibition including photos of the late-Hull-born Mick Ronson who worked with David Bowie. Former United Nations Secretary-General Kofi Annan was awarded the Wilberforce Medallion at the 2017 festival.

Early October sees the arrival of Hull Fair which is one of Europe's largest travelling funfairs and takes place on land adjacent to the MKM Stadium.

The city's Pride in Hull festival is one of the largest free-to-attend LGBT+ Pride events in the UK, attracting in excess of 50,000 attendees. Headline performers have included Adore Delano, Louise Redknapp, Marc Almond, Nadine Coyle of Girls Aloud, and B*Witched.

The Hull Global Food Festival held its third annual event in the city's Queen Victoria Square for three days – 4–6 September 2009. According to officials, the event in 2007 attracted 125,000 visitors and brought some £5 million in revenue to the area. In 2007 the Hull Metalfest began in the Welly Club, it featured major label bands from the United States, Canada and Italy, as well as the UK. The first Hull Comedy Festival, which included performers such as Stewart Lee and Russell Howard was held in 2007.

In 2010, Hull marked the 25th anniversary of the death of the poet Philip Larkin with the Larkin 25 Festival. This included the popular Larkin with Toads public art event. The 40 Larkin toads were displayed around Hull and later sold off in a charity auction. A charity appeal raised funds to cast a life-size bronze statue of Philip Larkin, to a design by Martin Jennings, at Hull Paragon Interchange. The statue was unveiled at a ceremony attended by the Lord Mayor of Hull on 2 December 2010, the 25th anniversary of Larkin's death. It bears an inscription drawn from the first line of Larkin's poem, 'The Whitsun Weddings'.

In 2013, from 29 April to 5 May, Hull Fashion Week took place with various events happening in venues in and around Hull's City centre. It finished with a finale on 5 May at Hull Paragon Interchange, when recently reformed pop group Atomic Kitten appeared in a celebrity fashion show.

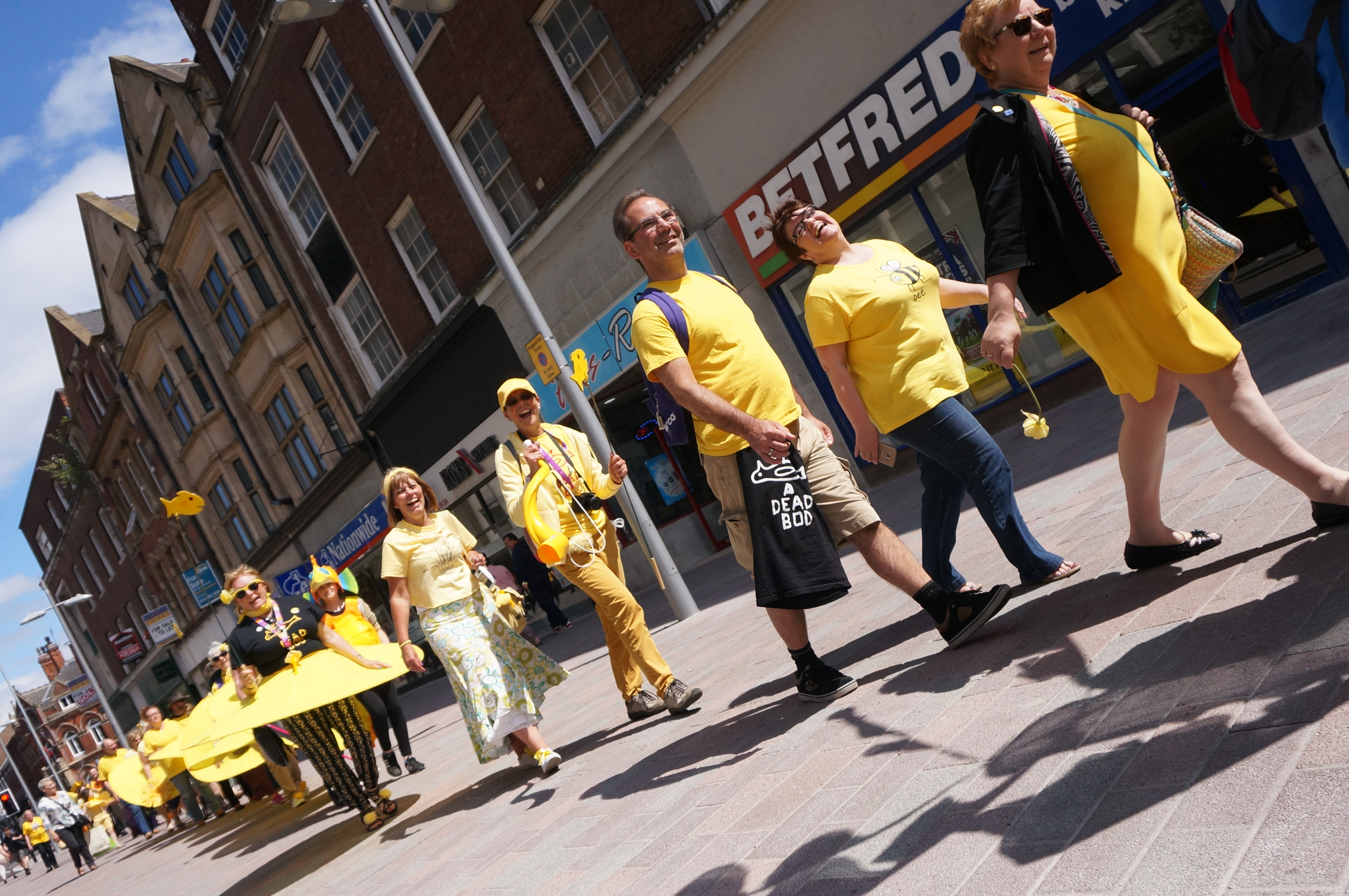
Yellow Day Hull, 24 June 2017

The first Yellow Day Hull event, organised by Hull-born Preston Likely, was staged on 24 June 2017. Likely invited everybody in the city to participate in the event, encouraging all participants to either wear, carry or make something yellow in order to celebrate the city's history and culture.

On 3 August 2013, the second Humber Street Sesh Festival took place celebrating local music talent and arts, with several stages showcasing bands and artists from the Fruit Trade Music Label, Humber Street Sesh and Purple Worm Records. The festival has taken place yearly, with the exception of 2021 where the festival took place in September being renamed 'Inner City Sesh' and taking place in Queens Gardens.

In 2018, the 16th Pride in Hull festival saw attendees take part in the annual celebration of LGBT+ culture.

=== Charity ===
Kingston is home to the charity group The Society of M.I.C.E., modelled after the Grand Order of Water Rats. MICE stands for Men In Charitable Endeavour.

== Cultural references ==
=== Poetry ===
Hull has attracted the attention of poets to the extent that Australian author Peter Porter described it as "the most poetic city in England".

Philip Larkin set many of his poems in Hull, including "The Whitsun Weddings", "Toads", and "Here". Scottish-born Douglas Dunn's Terry Street, a portrait of working-class Hull life, is one of the outstanding poetry collections of the 1970s. Dunn forged close associations with such Hull poets as Peter Didsbury and Sean O'Brien. The works of some of these writers appear in the 1982 Bloodaxe anthology A Rumoured City, which Dunn edited. Andrew Motion, past Poet Laureate, lectured at the University of Hull between 1976 and 1981, and Roger McGough studied there. Both poets spoke at the Humber Mouth Festival in 2010. Contemporary poets associated with Hull are Maggie Hannan, David Wheatley, and Caitriona O'Reilly.

17th-century metaphysical poet and parliamentarian Andrew Marvell was born nearby, and grew up and received his education in the city. There is a statue in his honour in the Market Square (Trinity Square), set against the backdrop of his alma mater Hull Grammar School.

=== Music ===
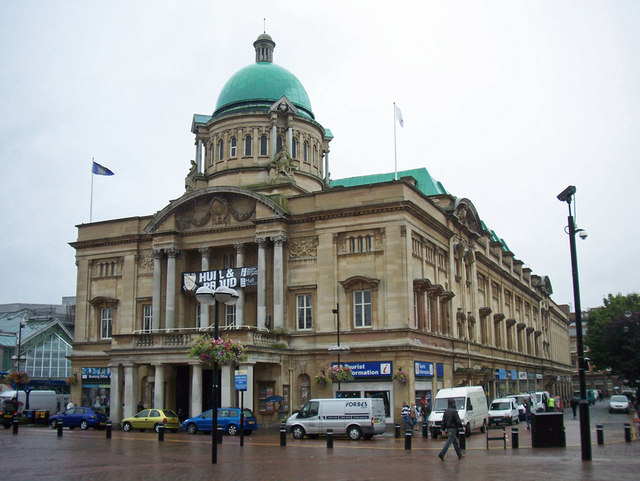
Hull City Hall, completed in 1909

==== Classical ====
In the field of classical music, Hull is home to Sinfonia UK Collective (formerly Hull Sinfonietta, founded in 2004), a national and international touring group that serves Hull and its surrounding regions in its role as Ensemble in Residence at University of Hull, and also the Hull Philharmonic Orchestra, one of the oldest amateur orchestras in the country. and formerly The Hull Philharmonic Youth Orchestra, established in 1952, the Hull Choral Union, the Hull Bach Choir – which specialises in the performance of 17th- and 18th-century choral music – the Hull Male Voice Choir, the Arterian Singers and two Gilbert & Sullivan Societies: the Dagger Lane Operatic Society and the Hull Savoyards are also based in Hull. There are two brass bands, the East Yorkshire Motor Services Band, who are the current North of England Area Brass Band Champions, and East Riding of Yorkshire Band who are the 2014 North of England Regional Champions within their section.

Hull City Hall annually plays host to major British and European symphony Orchestras with its 'International Masters' orchestral concert season. During the 2009–10 season visiting orchestras included the St Petersburg Symphony Orchestra and the Czech National Symphony Orchestra. Internationally renowned touring pop, rock, and comedy acts also regularly play the City Hall.

In September 2013 a five-year partnership with the Royal Philharmonic Orchestra was announced by the City Council.

==== Rock, pop and folk ====
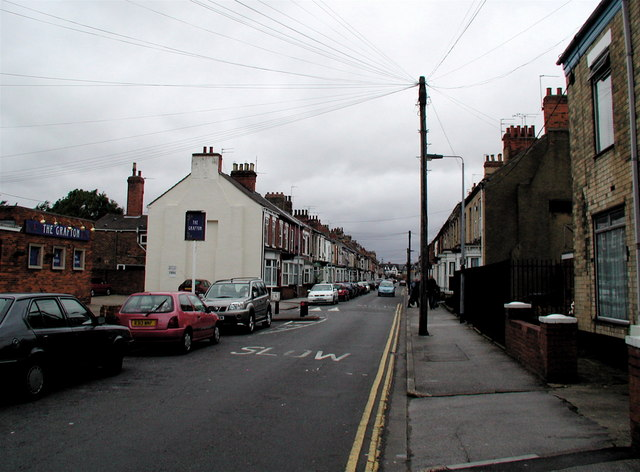
Grafton Street, birthplace of the Housemartins and the Beautiful South

On the popular music scene, in the 1960s, Mick Ronson of the Hull band Rats worked closely with David Bowie and was heavily involved in production of the album The Rise and Fall of Ziggy Stardust and the Spiders from Mars. Ronson later went on to record with Lou Reed, Bob Dylan, Morrissey and the Wildhearts. There is a Mick Ronson Memorial Stage in Queen's Gardens in Hull. The 1960s were also notable for the revival of English folk music, of which the Hull-based quartet, the Watersons were prominent exponents. The Who performed and recorded a concert, at the Hull City Hall, on 15 February 1970.

In the 1980s, Hull groups such as the Red Guitars, the Housemartins and Everything but the Girl found mainstream success, followed by Kingmaker in the 1990s. Paul Heaton, former member of the Housemartins went on to front the Beautiful South. Another former member of the Housemartins, Norman Cook, now performs as Fatboy Slim. In 1982, Hull-born Paul Anthony Cook, Stuart Matthewman and Paul Spencer Denman formed the group Sade. In 1984, the singer Helen Adu signed to CBS Records and the group released the album Diamond Life. The album had sales of four million copies.

The pioneering industrial band Throbbing Gristle formed in Hull; Genesis P-Orridge (Neil Megson) attended Hull University between 1968 and 1969, where he met Cosey Fanni Tutti (Christine Newby), who was born in the city, and first became part of the Hull performance art group COUM Transmissions in 1970.

The record label Pork Recordings started in Hull in the mid-1990s, and has released music by Fila Brazillia.

The New Adelphi is a popular local venue for alternative live music in the city, and has achieved notability outside Hull, having hosted such bands as the Stone Roses, Radiohead, Green Day, and Oasis in its history, while the Springhead caters to a variety of bands and has been recognised nationally as a 'Live Music Pub of the Year'.

In the 2000s, Hull indie rock band the Paddingtons saw mainstream success with two UK Top 40 singles in 2005, later reforming in 2014 and performing at the Humber Street Sesh.

In the 1990s, the duo Scarlet from Hull had two Top 40 hits with "Independent Love Song" and "I Wanna Be Free (To Be With Him)" in 1995.

The Humber Street Sesh night has released four DIY compilations featuring the cream of Hull's live music scene, and there are currently a few labels emerging in the city, including Purple Worm Records based at Hull College, with bands such as The Blackbirds showing a promising future.

== Religion ==
Hull Minster

Religion	2001		2011		2021	
Religion	Number	%	Number	%	Number	%
No religion	44,627	18.3	89,336	34.8	131,424	49.2
Holds religious beliefs	178,386	73.3	148,665	58.0	118,635	44.4
Christian	174,758	71.7	140,753	54.9	106,411	39.9
Muslim	2,116	0.9	5,447	2.1	9,285	3.5
Buddhist	374	0.2	771	0.3	746	0.3
Hindu	257	0.1	439	0.2	646	0.2
Sikh	227	0.1	289	0.1	277	0.1
Jewish	265	0.1	172	0.1	146	0.1
Other religion	389	0.2	794	0.3	1,124	0.4
Religion not stated	20,576	8.4	18,405	7.2	16,957	6.4
Total population	243,589	100.0	256,406	100.0	267,013	100.0

Unlike many other English cities, Hull has no cathedral. Since 13 May 2017, the Holy Trinity Church (dating back to 1300) became a Minster, known as Hull Minster. It is a part of the Anglican Diocese of York and has a suffragan bishop.

Hull forms part of the Roman Catholic Diocese of Middlesbrough's southern vicariate. St Charles Borromeo is the oldest post-Reformation Roman Catholic church in the city.

There are several seamen's missions and churches in Hull. The Mission to Seafarers has a centre at West King George Dock and the St Nikolaj Danish Seamen's Church is located in Osborne Street.

== Parks and green spaces ==
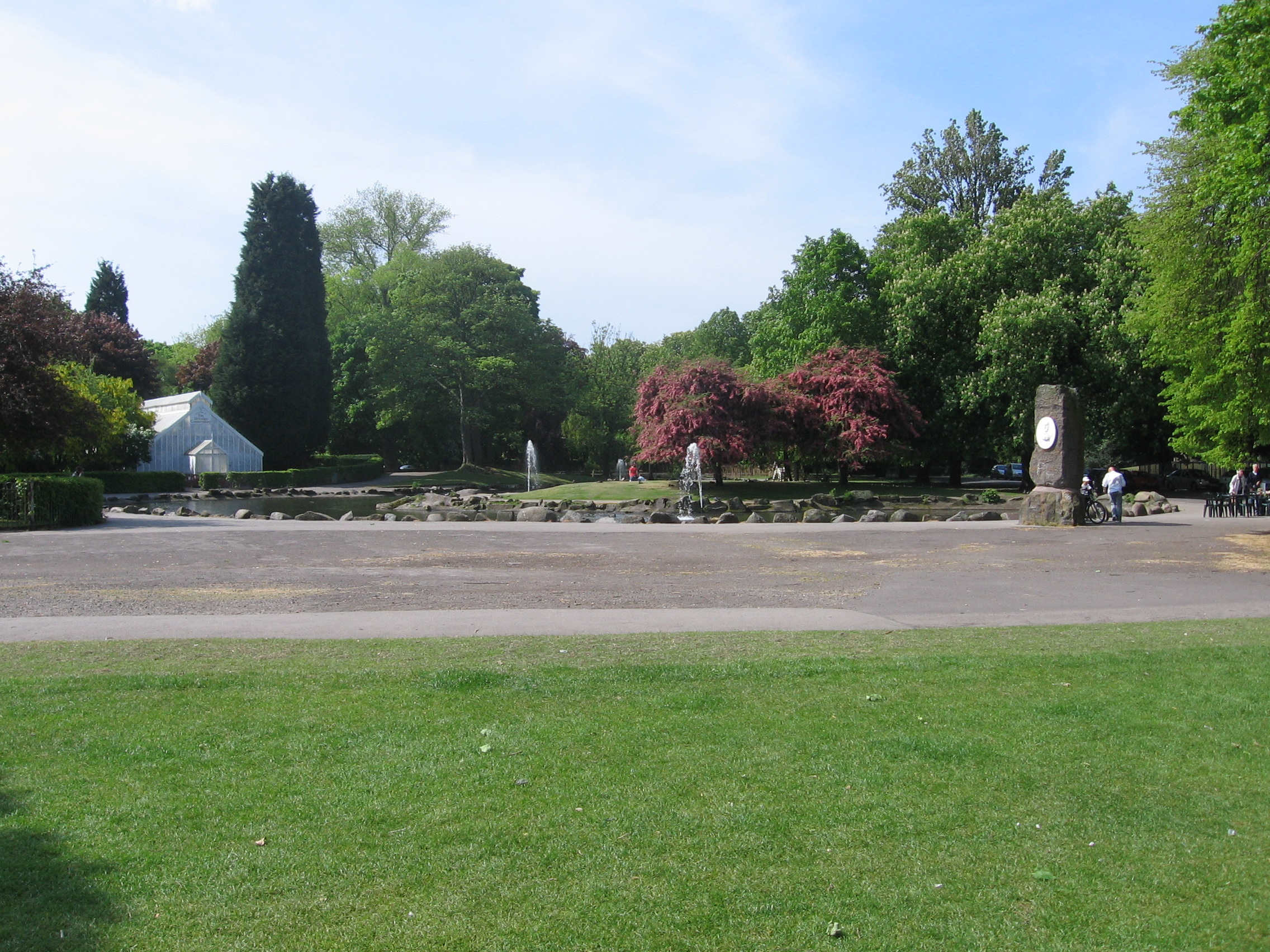
View of Pearson Park

Hull has a large number of parks and green spaces. These include East Park, Pearson Park, Pickering Park, Peter Pan Park (Costello Playing fields), and West Park. West Park is home to Hull's MKM Stadium. Pearson Park contains a lake and a 'Victorian Conservatory' housing birds and reptiles. East Park has a large boating lake and a collection of birds and animals, the latest additions being a pair of rehomed Shetland ponies. East Park and Pearson Park are registered Grade II listed sites by Historic England. The city centre has the large Queen's Gardens parkland at its heart. This was originally built as formal ornamental gardens used to fill in the former Queen's Dock. It is now a more flexible grassed and landscaped area used for concerts and festivals, but retains a large ornamental flower circus and fountain at its western end. In February 2022, the first phase of a £11.7 million redevelopment of the gardens began. The second phase started in June 2023 and is expected to take 14 months to complete.

A report by The Countryside Charity in October 2023 found that no Local Green Space designations had been made to protect any of the cities open spaces, but Hull City Council indicated that protection was offered in the 2017 Hull Local Plan.

The streets of Hull's suburban areas also lined with large numbers of trees, particularly the Avenues area around Princes Avenue, and Boulevard to the west. Many of the old trees in the Avenues district have been felled in recent years with the stumps carved into a variety of 'living sculptures'.

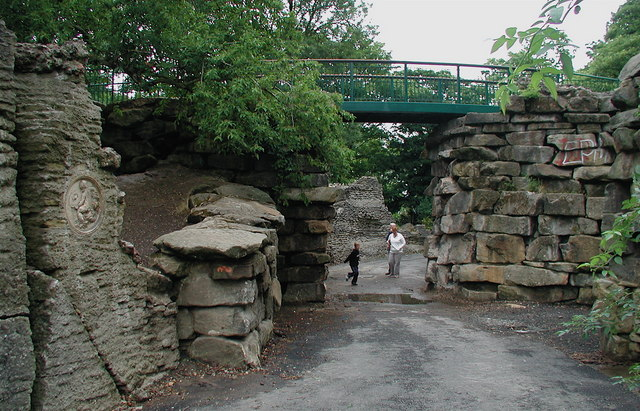
East Park's Khyber Pass Folly in Kingston upon Hull as of 15 January 2011

West Hull has a district known as 'Botanic'. This recalls the short-lived Botanic Garden that once existed on the site now occupied by Hymers College. Elephants once lived nearby in the former Zoological Gardens on Spring Bank and were paraded in the local streets. The land has since been redeveloped. There was also a former Botanic Garden between Hessle Road and the Anlaby Road commemorated by Linnaeus Street.

== Media ==
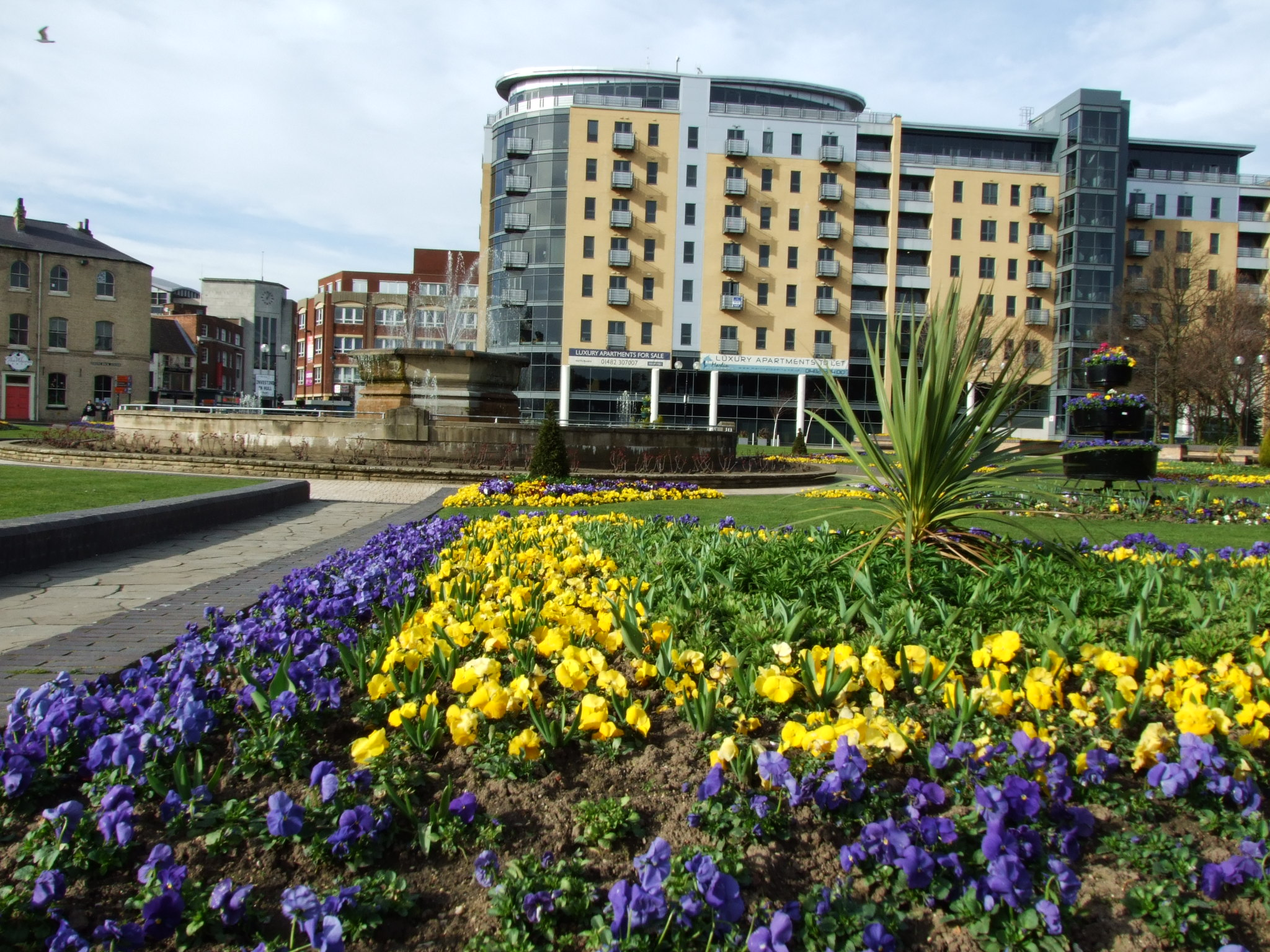
The BBC building in Hull

Hull's local daily newspaper is the Hull Daily Mail. The city was once served by three competing daily newspapers, all operating from the Whitefriargate area Eastern Morning News, Hull News and Hull and East Yorkshire Times. On 17 April 1930 the last edition of Evening News was published after the paper was taken over by the Hull Daily Mail.

Local listings and what's-on guides include Tenfoot City Magazine and Sandman Magazine. The BBC has its Yorkshire and Lincolnshire regional headquarters at Queen's Gardens.

Radio services broadcasting from the city are community radio stations, Hull's 107FM, 106.9 West Hull FM (formerly WHCR FM) and hospital radio station Kingstown Radio. The BBC's regional station BBC Radio Humberside is based in Hull and broadcasts to East Yorkshire & Northern Lincolnshire. Commercial stations for the city Hits Radio East Yorkshire & North Lincolnshire (formerly Viking FM) and Nation Radio East Yorkshire (formerly KCFM) broadcast from outside of Hull and are now part of a national network like Capital Yorkshire which has a base over 60 miles (100 km) away in Leeds. The Hull University Union's student radio station Jam 1575, stopped broadcasting on MW.

== Sport ==
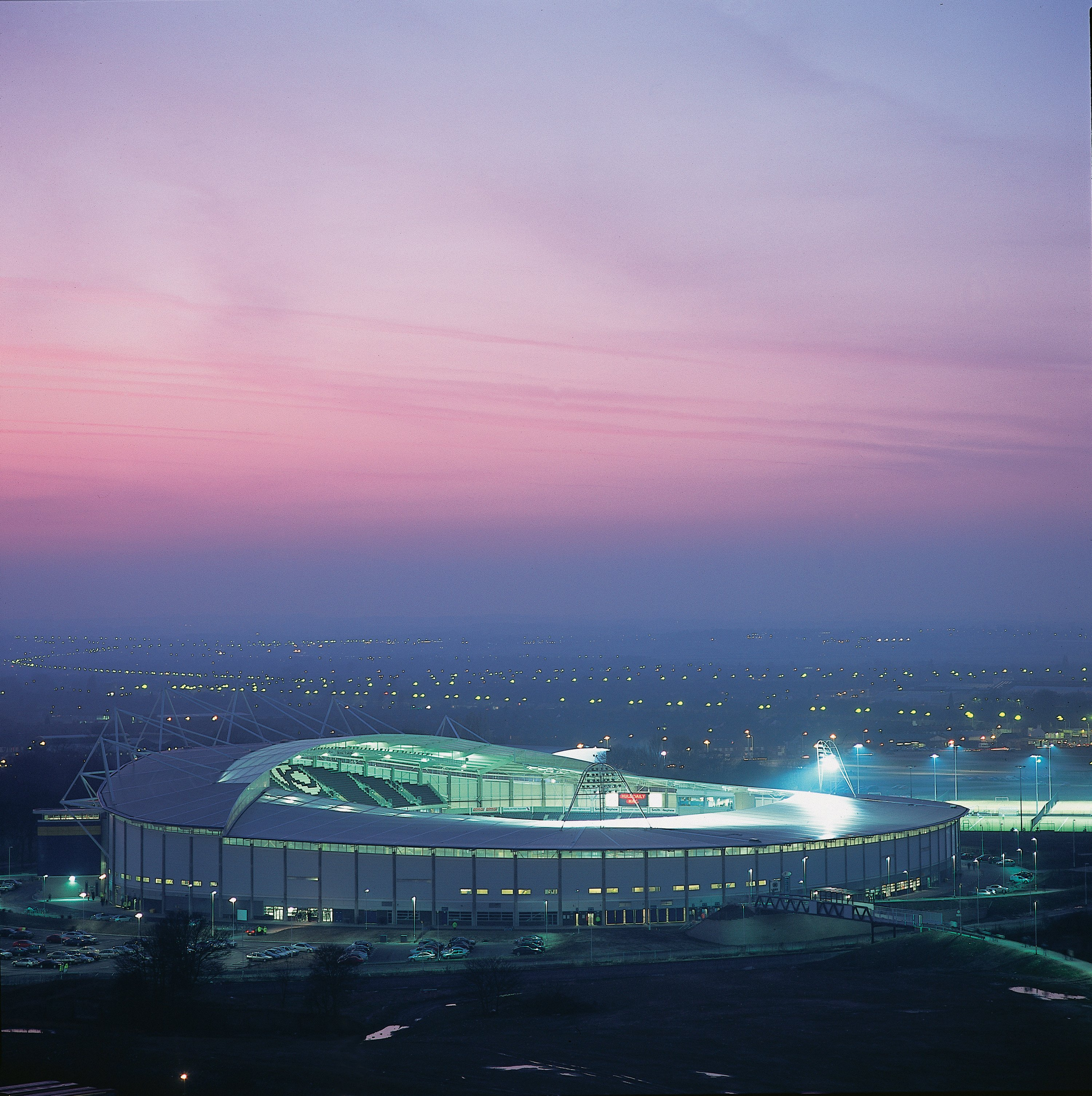
The MKM Stadium

Sports in the city include professional football, rugby league, rugby union, golf, darts, athletics, and watersports.

The city's professional football club, Hull City A.F.C., play in the Premier League, the first tier of the English football league system, after promotion, via the playoffs, from the EFL Championship, in the 2025–26 season. The team play at the MKM Stadium. There are also two non-league clubs based in the city, Hall Road Rangers, and Hull United, who play at Haworth Park. The latter play in the Humber Premier League.

A popular sport in Hull is rugby league, with the city supplying two teams in to the Super League competition. The first is Hull FC, who were founded in 1865, and are one of the founding clubs of rugby league. They play at the MKM Stadium. Also in Super League are Hull Kingston Rovers, who play at Sewell Group Craven Park Stadium in East Hull, following promotion from the Championship in 2017. There are also several lower league teams in the city, such as East Hull, West Hull, Hull Dockers and Hull Isberg, who all play in the National Conference League.

Rugby union is catered for by Hull Ionians who play at Brantingham Park. and Hull RUFC who are based in the city. From the 2023–24 season, both clubs will play in the National League 2 North.

The city has two athletics clubs based at the Costello Stadium in the west of the city – Kingston upon Hull Athletics Club and Hull Achilles Athletics Club.

Hull Cycle Speedway Club is at the Hessle raceway near the Humber bridge. The side race in the sports Northern league and won both the league titles in 2008. Other cycling clubs also operate including Hull Thursday, the area's road racing group.

Hull Arena, is an ice rink and concert venue, which is home to the Hull Seahawks ice hockey team who play in the NIHL National Division for the 2022–23 season. It is also home to the Kingston Kestrels ice sledge hockey team. In August 2010, Hull Daily Mail reported that Hull Stingrays was facing closure, following a financial crisis. The club was subsequently saved from closure following a takeover by Coventry Blaze. But on 24 June 2015, the club announced on its official website that it has been placed into liquidation.

The Hull Hornets American football existed from 2005 until 2011. The club, which acquired full member status in the British American Football League on 5 November 2006, played in the BAFL Division 2 Central league for 5 years. The Humber Warhawks formed in 2013 became Hull's American football team. Greyhound racing returned to the city on 25 October 2007 when The Boulevard stadium re-opened as a venue for the sport. In mid-2006 Hull was home to the professional wrestling company One Pro Wrestling, which held the Devils Due event on 27 July in the Gemtec Arena. From 16 May 2008, Hull gained its own homegrown wrestling company based at the Eastmount Recreation Centre—New Generation Wrestling—that have featured El Ligero, Kris Travis, and Alex Shane.

Hull Lacrosse Club was formed in 2008 and was in 2012 playing in the Premier 3 division of the North of England Men's Lacrosse Association.

The city played host to the Clipper Round the World Yacht Race for the 2009–10 35,000-mile (56,000 km) race around the globe, which started on 13 September 2009 and finished on 17 July 2010. The locally named yacht, Hull and Humber, captained by Danny Watson, achieved second place in the 2007–2008 race.

The city hosted The British Open Squash Championships at the KC Stadium in 2013 and 2014, before moving to the adjacent Airco Arena in 2015, as part of a three-year deal.

Swimming is hosted at Beverley Road Baths, Woodford Leisure Centre, the Ennerdale Centre, and Albert Avenue Baths. Albert Avenue pools were established in 1933, with an outdoor pool which shut to swimmers in 1995, but has been used for canoe training. A major refurbishment to upgrade the complex and to return outdoor swimming was announced in 2021, this included a fitness studio, gym and general upgrades. The £10.5 million refurbished facilities opened in August 2023.

== Transport ==
Hull Paragon Interchange, opened on 16 September 2007, is the city's transport hub, combining the existing main bus and rail termini in an integrated complex. In 2009, it was expected to have 24,000 people passing through the complex each day.

=== Railway ===
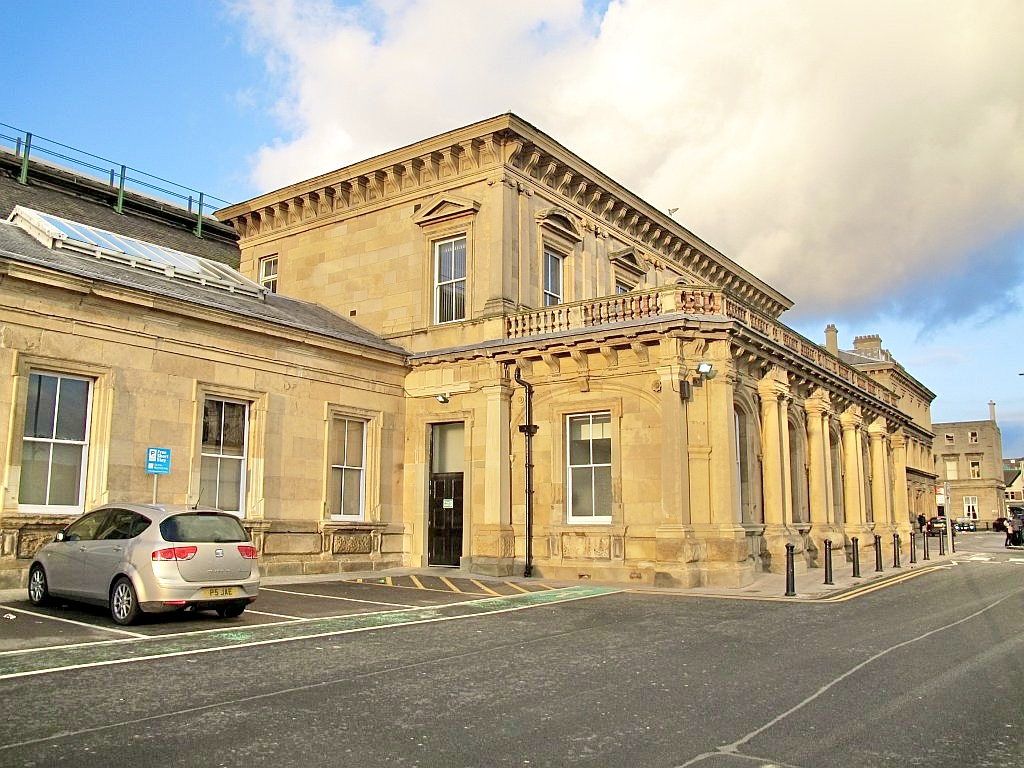
Original entrance to Hull Paragon station, dating from 1847

Hull Paragon Exchange is served by four train operating companies:

- Hull Trains operates regular express services to London King's Cross
- London North Eastern Railway runs one service per day to London King's Cross in each direction
- TransPennine Express operates a route to Manchester Piccadilly via Leeds
- Northern Trains operates regular local stopping trains to Halifax via Selby, Leeds and Bradford Interchange; to York via Brough and Selby; to Sheffield via Doncaster; and to Scarborough via Beverley and Bridlington.

In the 1960s, Hull and Hornsea Railway and Hull and Holderness Railway branch lines closed, with all goods traffic transferred to the high-level line that circles the city.

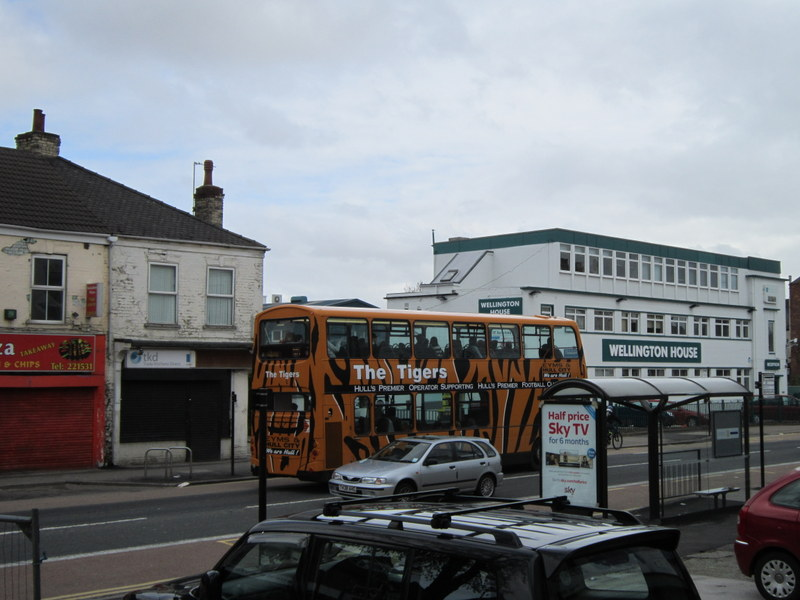
East Yorkshire Motor Services bus in Hull City Football Club colours

=== Buses ===
Bus services in and around the city are provided by East Yorkshire, a Go-Ahead Group company which was previously known as East Yorkshire Motor Services, and by Stagecoach in Hull.

To provide greater travel flexibility, bus users can obtain a Hull Card which can be used on services run by either operator.

=== Bridges ===
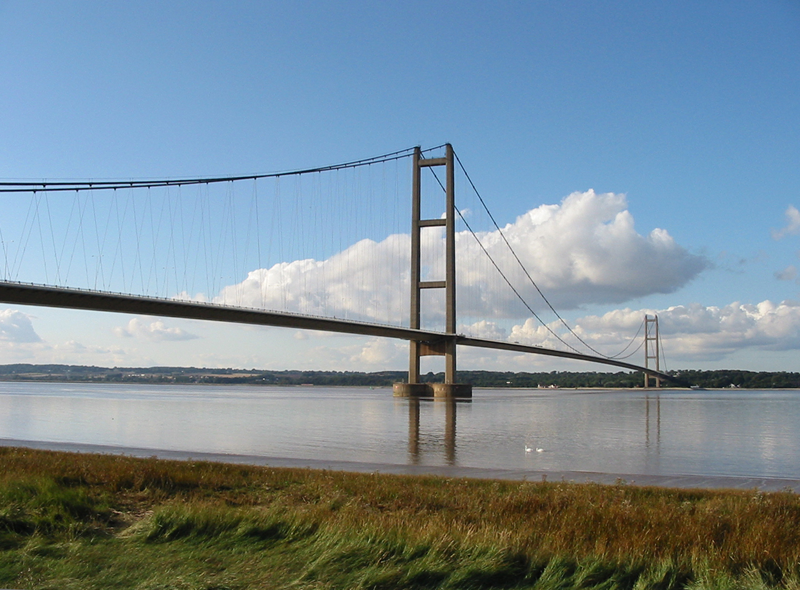
The Humber Bridge from the south bank

Hull is close to the Humber Bridge, which provides links to south of the river Humber. It was built between 1972 and 1981, and at that time was the longest single-span suspension bridge in the world. It is, as of 2024, twelfth on the list. Before the bridge was built, those wishing to cross the Humber had to either take a Humber Ferry or travel inland as far as Goole.

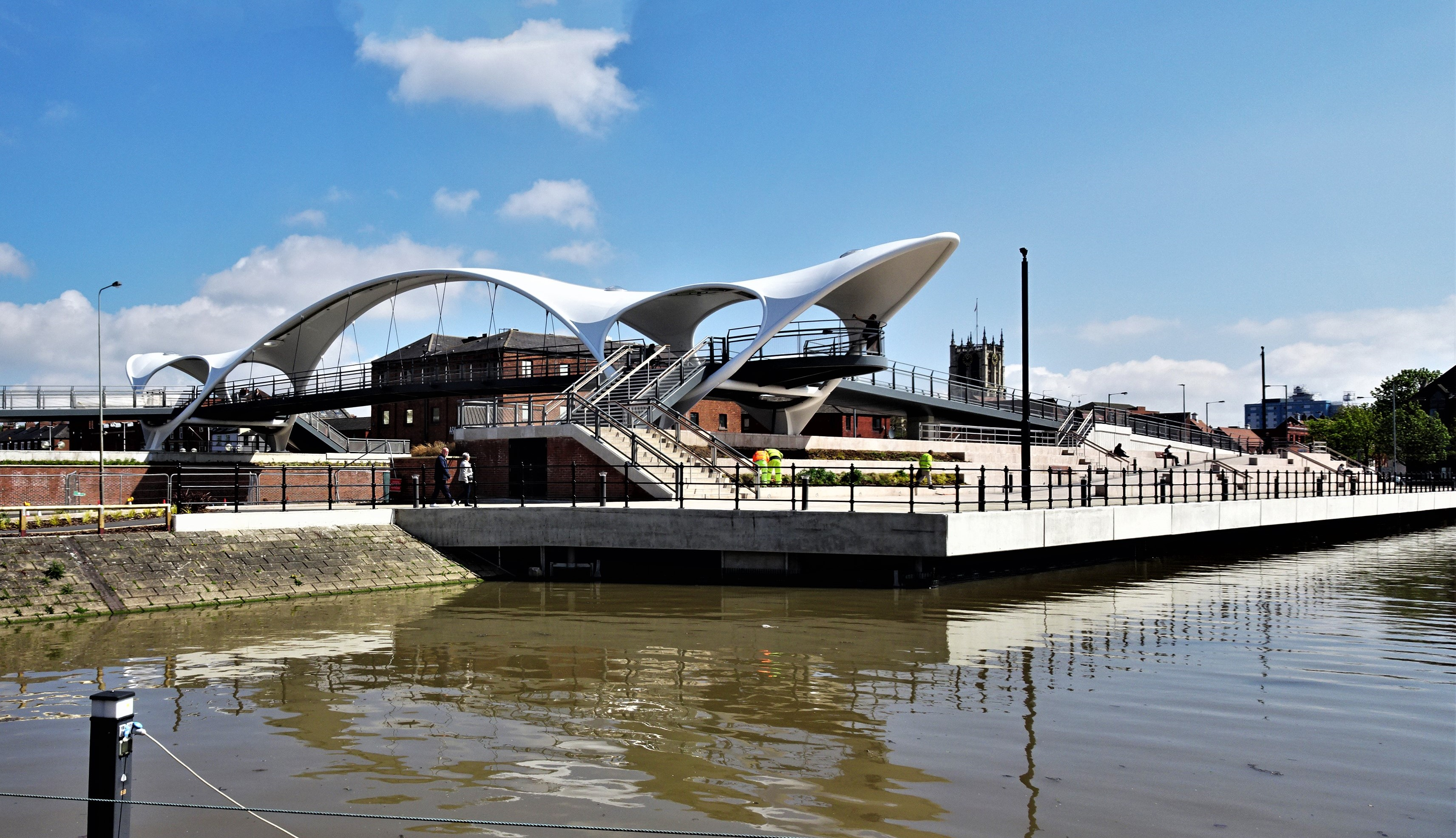
Murdoch's Connection

In March 2021, a new footbridge was opened connecting the city to Princes Quay waterfront, marina and fruit market over Castle Street, a dual carriageway road also designated A63. Named Murdoch's Connection after Hull's first female doctor, GP Mary Murdoch, the name was nominated by pupils from Newland School for Girls in Newland, Hull. Works began in autumn 2018 but progress was delayed due to the coronavirus pandemic. There was no opening ceremony due to distancing restrictions; instead, videos were compiled. Members of the public have been requested not to attach love locks.

=== Ports ===
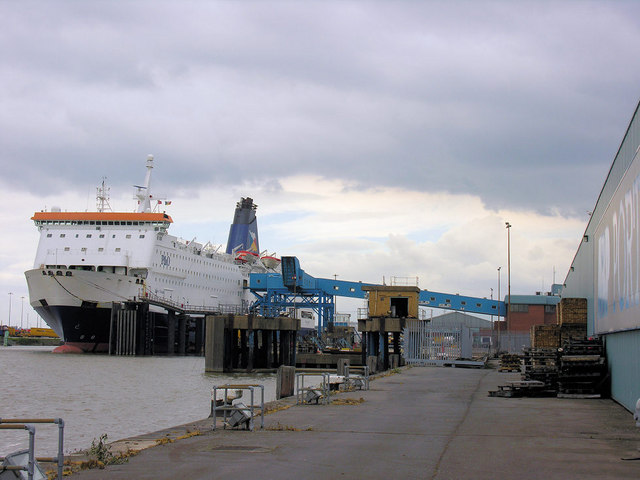
Hull to Zeebrugge ferry at King George Dock

P&O Ferries provide daily overnight ferry services from King George Dock in Hull to Rotterdam. Services to Rotterdam are worked by ferries MS Pride of Rotterdam and Pride of Hull. Previous Services to Zeebrugge were worked by ferrie Pride of Bruges and Pride of York (previously named MS Norsea). Both Pride of Rotterdam and Pride of Hull are too wide to pass through the lock at Hull. Associated British Ports built a new terminal at Hull to accommodate the passengers using these two ferries. The Rotterdam Terminal at the Port of Hull, was built at a cost of £14.3 million. In January 2021, P&O Ferries ceased their overnight ferry to Zeebrugge.

=== Airports ===
The nearest airport is Humberside Airport, 20 miles (32 km) away in Lincolnshire, which provides a few charter flights but also has high-frequency flights to Amsterdam with KLM and Aberdeen with Eastern Airways each day.

The nearest airport with intercontinental flights is Leeds Bradford Airport is 70 miles (110 km) away.

=== Cycling ===
According to the 2001 census data cycling in the city is well above the national average of 2%, with a 12% share of the travel to work traffic. A report by the University of East London in 2011 ranked Hull as the fourth-best cycling city in the United Kingdom.

=== Roads ===
The main road into and out of Hull is the M62 motorway/A63 road, one of the main east–west routes in Northern England. It provides a link to the cities of Leeds, Manchester and Liverpool, as well as the rest of the country via the UK motorway network. The motorway itself ends some distance from the city; the rest of the route is along the A63 dual carriageway. This east–west route forms a small part of the European road route E20.

Road transport in Hull suffers from delays caused both by the many bridges over the navigable River Hull, which bisects the city and can cause disruption at busy times.

The city has three railway level crossings in the city; it formerly had more with bridges built to go over the tracks on Hessle Road in 1962 and Anlaby Road in 1964. A nearby road was renamed from Garrison Road to Roger Millward Way in 2018, after rugby player Roger Millward who played for Hull Kingston Rovers. The developments are part of a wider improvement and redevelopment scheme.

== Infrastructure ==
=== Telephone system ===
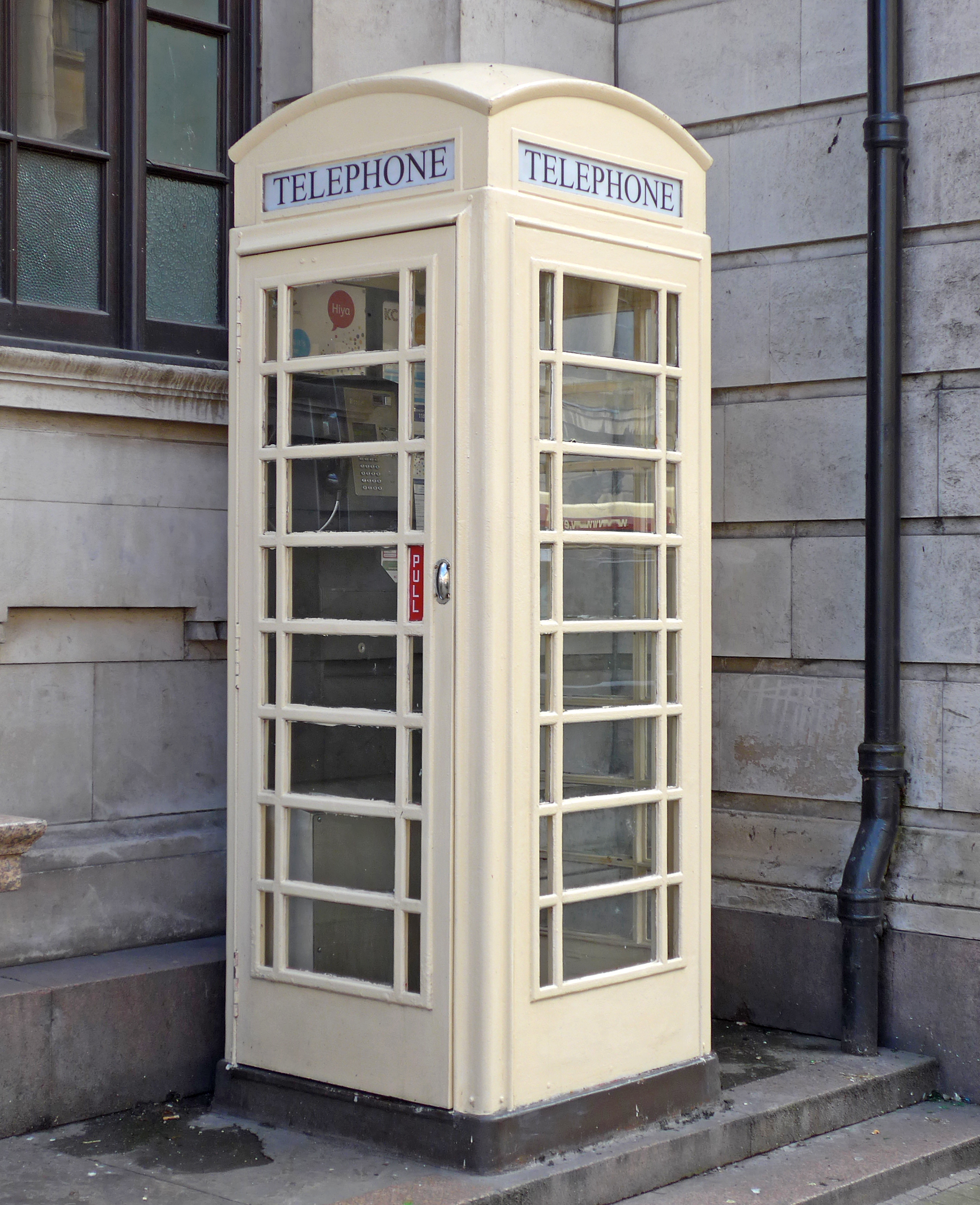
A Hull K6 telephone box

Hull is the only city in the UK with its own independent telephone network company, KCOM, formerly KC and Kingston Communications, a subsidiary of KCOM Group. Its distinctive cream telephone boxes can be seen across the city. KCOM produces its own 'White Pages' telephone directory for Hull and the wider KC area. Colour Pages is KCOM's business directory, the counterpart to Yellow Pages. The company was formed in 1902 as a municipal department by the City Council and is an early example of municipal enterprise. It remains the only locally operated telephone company in the UK, although it is now privatised. KCOM's Internet brands are Karoo Broadband (ISP serving Hull) and Eclipse (national ISP). Initially Hull City Council retained a 44.9 per cent interest in the company and used the proceeds from the sale of shares to fund the city's sports venue, the MKM Stadium, among other things. On 24 May 2007 it sold its remaining stake in the company for over £107 million.

KCOM (Kingston Communications) was one of the first telecoms operators in Europe to offer ADSL to business users, and the first in the world to run an interactive television service using ADSL, known as Kingston Interactive TV (KiT), which has since been discontinued due to financial problems. In the last decade, the KCOM Group has expanded beyond Hull and diversified its service portfolio to become a nationwide provider of telephone, television, and Internet access services, having close to 180,000 customers projected for 2007. After its ambitious programme of expansion, KCOM has struggled in recent years and now has partnerships with other telecommunications firms such as BT who are contracted to manage its national infrastructure. Telephone House, on Carr Lane, the firm's 1960s-built headquarters, in stark modernist style, is a local landmark.

In October 2019, Hull became the first UK city to have full fibre broadband available for all residents.

=== Hydraulic power ===
The first public hydraulic power network, supplying many companies, was constructed in Hull. The Hull Hydraulic Power Company began operation in 1877, with Edward B. Ellington as its engineer and the main pumping station (now a Grade II listed building) in Catherine Street. Ellington was involved in most British networks, including those in London, Liverpool, Birmingham, Manchester and Glasgow, but the advent of electrical power combined with wartime damage meant the Hull company was wound up in 1947.

=== Public services ===
Policing in Kingston upon Hull is provided by Humberside Police. In October 2006 the force was named (jointly with Northamptonshire Police) as the worst-performing police force in the United Kingdom, based on data released from the Home Office. However, after a year of "major improvements", the Home Office list released in October 2007 shows the force rising several places (although still among the bottom six of 43 forces rated). Humberside Police received ratings of "good" or "fair" in most categories.

HM Prison Hull is located in the city and is operated by HM Prison Service. It caters for up to 1,000 Category B/C adult male prisoners.

Statutory emergency fire and rescue service is provided by the Humberside Fire and Rescue Service, which has its headquarters near Hessle and five fire stations in Hull. This service was formed in 1974 following local government reorganisation from the amalgamation of the East Riding of Yorkshire County Fire Service, Grimsby Borough Fire and Rescue Service, Kingston Upon Hull City Fire Brigade and part of the Lincoln (Lindsey) Fire Brigade and a small part of the West Riding of Yorkshire County Fire and Rescue Service.

Hull and East Yorkshire Hospitals NHS Trust provides healthcare from three sites, Hull Royal Infirmary, Castle Hill Hospital and, until 2008, Princess Royal Hospital and there are several private hospitals including ones run by Bupa and Nuffield Hospitals. The Yorkshire Ambulance Service provides emergency patient transport. NHS primary health care services are commissioned by the Hull Clinical Commissioning Group and are provided at several smaller clinics and general practitioner surgeries across the city. NHS Mental health services in Hull are provided by Humber NHS Foundation Trust. It runs a memory clinic in Coltman Street, west Hull designed to help older people with early onset dementia.

Waste management is co-ordinated by the local authority. The Waste Recycling Group is a company which works in partnership with the Hull City and East Riding of Yorkshire councils to deal with the waste produced by residents. The company plans to build an energy from waste plant at Salt End to deal with 240,000 tonnes of rubbish and put waste to a productive use by providing power for the equivalent of 20,000 houses. Hull's distribution network operator for electricity is CE Electric UK (YEDL); there are no power stations in the city. Yorkshire Water manages Hull's drinking and waste water. Drinking water is provided by boreholes and aquifers in the East Riding of Yorkshire, and it is abstracted from the River Hull at Tophill Low, near Hutton Cranswick. Should either supply experience difficulty meeting demand, water abstracted from the River Derwent at both Elvington and Loftsome Bridge can be moved to Hull via the Yorkshire water grid. There are many reservoirs in the area for storage of potable and non-potable water. Waste water and sewage has to be transported in a wholly pumped system because of the flat nature of the terrain to a sewage treatment works at Salt End. The treatment works is partly powered by both a wind turbine and a biogas CHP engine.

== Education ==
=== Higher education ===
==== University of Hull ====
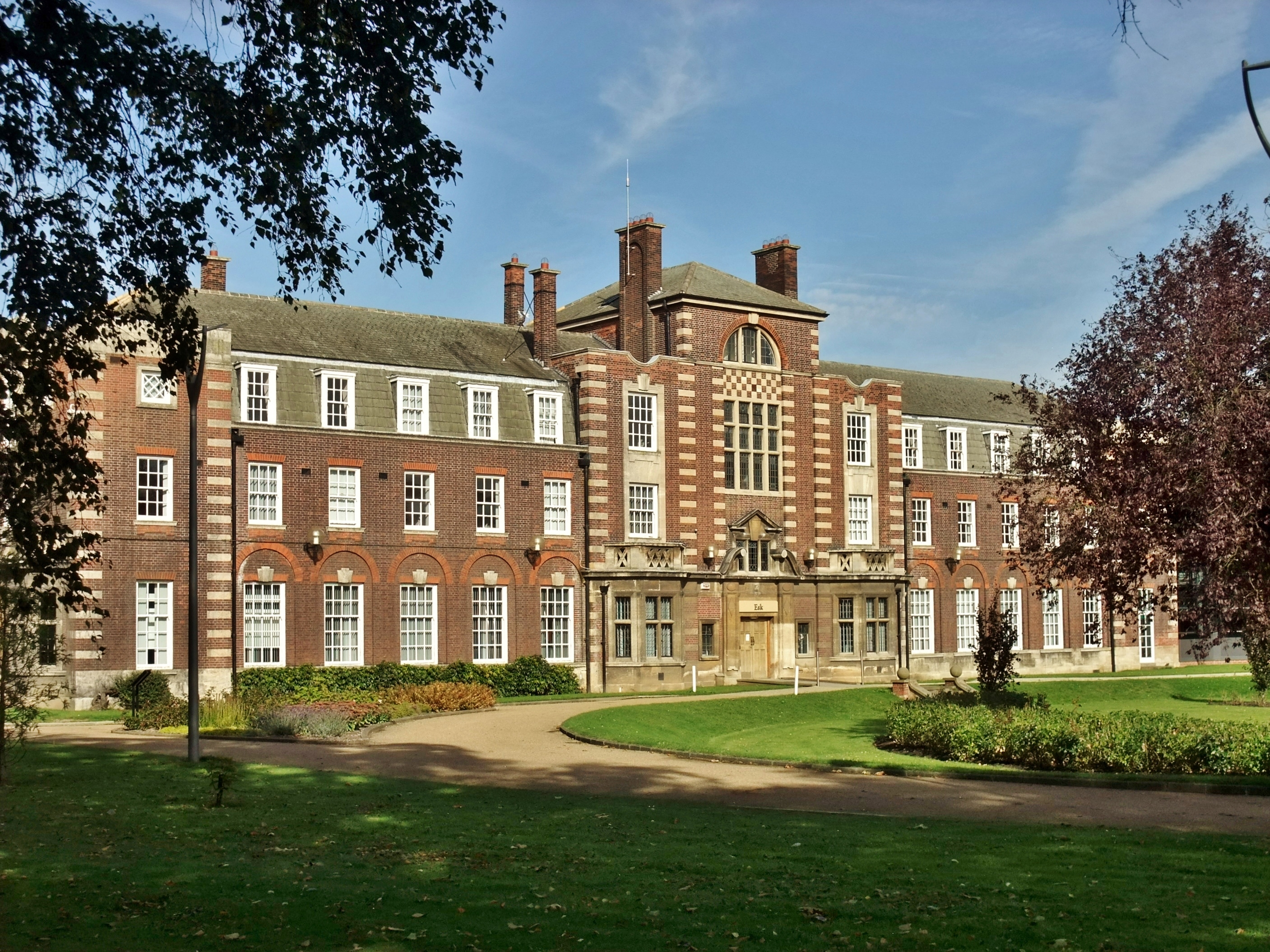
The Esk Building at the University of Hull campus on Cottingham Road

Kingston upon Hull is home to the University of Hull, which was founded in 1927 and received its Royal Charter in 1954. It now has a total student population of around 20,000 across its main campuses in Hull and Scarborough. The main University campus is in North Hull, on Cottingham Road. Notable alumni include former Deputy Prime Minister John Prescott, social scientist Lord Anthony Giddens, Woman's Hour presenter and writer Jenni Murray, Professor of Vaccinology at the University of Oxford and co-developer of the Oxford-AstraZeneca COVID-19 vaccine Dame Sarah Gilbert, Nobel Prize laureate and Professor of Economics at Stanford Graduate School of Business Guido Imbens, and the Oscar winning film director Anthony Minghella. The University of Hull is a partner in the new University Centre of the Grimsby Institute of Further and Higher Education (GIFE) being built in Grimsby, North Lincolnshire.

==== University of Lincoln ====
The University of Lincoln grew out of the University of Humberside, a former polytechnic based in Hull. In the 1990s the focus of the institution moved to nearby Lincoln and the administrative headquarters and management moved in 2001. The University of Lincoln has retained a campus in George Street in Hull city centre whilst Hull University purchased the adjacent University of Lincoln campus site on Cottingham Road.

=== Specialist ===
Hull York Medical School is a joint venture between the University of Hull and the University of York. It first admitted students in 2003 as a part of the British government's attempts to train more doctors.

The Northern Academy of Performing Arts and Northern Theatre School both provide education in musical theatre, performance and dance.

The Hull School of Art, founded in 1861, is regarded nationally and internationally for its excellence as a specialist creative centre for higher education.

=== Colleges ===
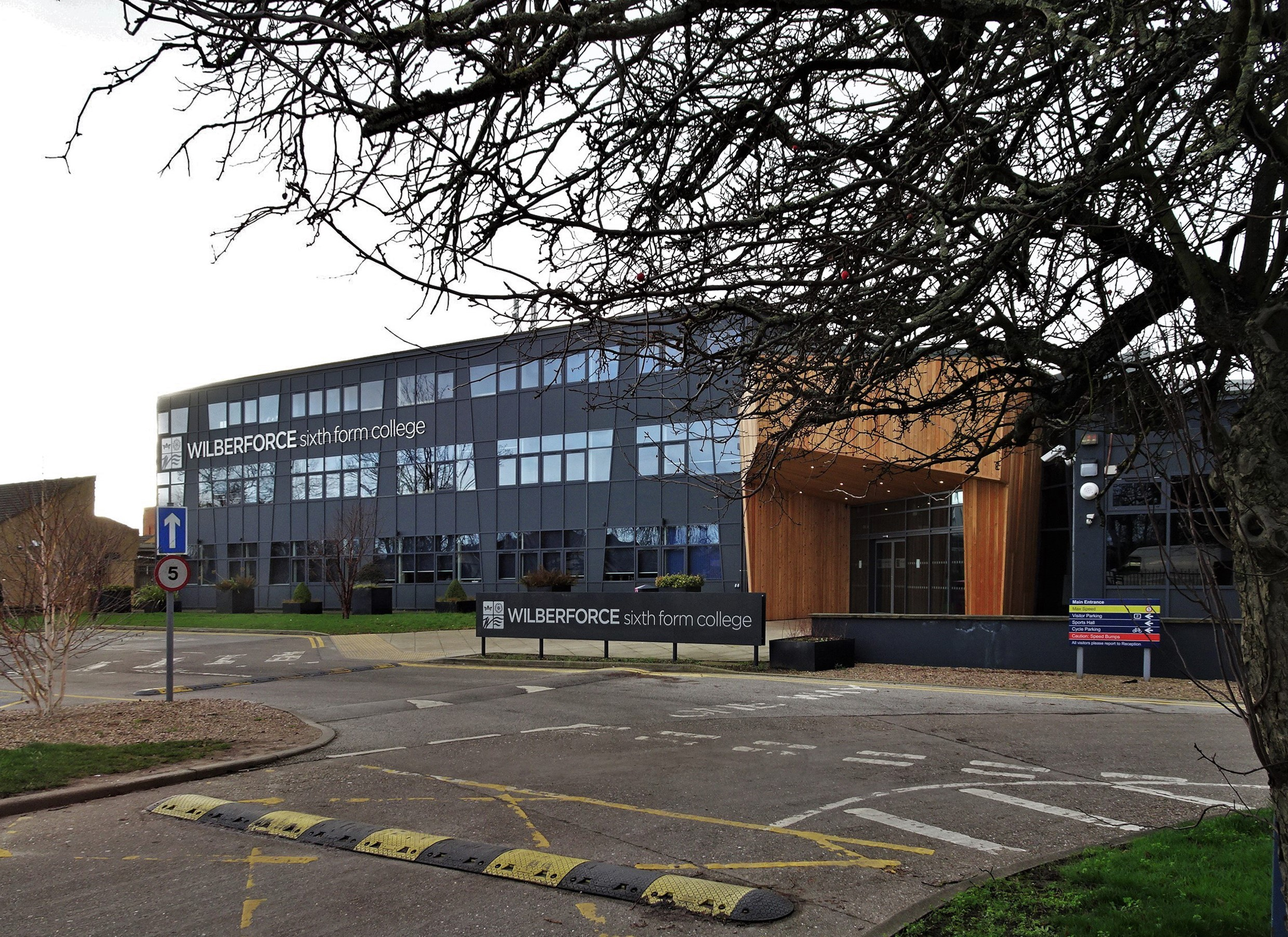
Wilberforce College

There is a further education college, Hull College, and two large sixth form colleges, Wyke College and Wilberforce College. East Riding College operates a small adult education campus in the city, and Endeavour Learning and Skills Centre is an adult education provision operated by Hull Training & Adult Education.

=== Schools ===
Hull has over 100 local schools; of these, Hull City Council supports 14 secondary and 71 primary schools. The highest achieving state school in Hull is Malet Lambert School, Schools which are independent of the City Council include Hymers College and Tranby School. The latter, which is run by the United Church Schools Trust, was formed by the merging of Hull Grammar School and Hull High School. Hull Trinity House Academy has been offering pre-sea training to prospective mariners since 1787, which was a boys only school until September 2022, when it began to admit girls. This left Newland School for Girls the only single-sex school in the city.

The city has had a poor examination success rate for many years and is often at the bottom of government GCSE league tables. In 2007 the city moved off the bottom of these tables for pupils who achieve five A* to C grades, including English and Maths, at General Certificate of Secondary Education by just one place when it came 149th out of 150 local education authorities. However, the improvement rate of 4.1 per cent, from 25.9 per cent in 2006 to 30 per cent in summer 2007, was among the best in the country. They returned to the bottom of the table in 2008 when 29.3 per cent achieved five A* to C grades which is well below the national average of 47.2 per cent. There are insufficient places in referral units for school children with special needs or challenging behaviour due to squeezed budgets and cuts to children's services.

== Dialect and accent ==
The local accent is quite distinctive and noticeably different from the rest of the East Riding; however it is still categorised among Yorkshire accents. The most notable feature of the accent is the strong I-mutation in words like goat, which is [ˈɡəʊt] in standard English and [ˈɡoːt] across most of Yorkshire, becomes [ˈɡɵːʔt̚ ] ("gert") in and around parts of Hull (cf. similar refined pronunciations in Leeds/York), although there is variation across areas and generations. In common with much of England (outside of the far north), another feature is dropping the H from the start of words, for example Hull is more often pronounced 'Ull in the city. The vowel in "Hull" is pronounced the same way as in northern English, however, and not as the very short /ʊ/ that exists in Lincolnshire. Though the rhythm of the accent is more like that of northern Lincolnshire than that of the rural East Riding, which is perhaps due to migration from Lincolnshire to the city during its industrial growth, one feature that it does share with the surrounding rural area is that an /aɪ/ sound in the middle of a word often becomes an /ɑː/: for example, "five" may sound like "fahve", "time" like "tahme".

The SQUARE–NURSE merger is a feature of Hull's dialect. The vowel sound in words such as burnt, nurse, first is pronounced with an /ɛ/ sound, as is also heard in Middlesbrough and in areas of Liverpool yet this sound is very uncommon in most of Yorkshire. The word pairs spur/spare and fur/fair illustrate this. The generational and/or geographic variation can be heard in word pairs like pork/poke or cork/coke, or hall/hole, which some people pronounce almost identically, sounding to non-locals like they are using the second of the two variations – while others make more of a vocal distinction; anyone called "Paul" (for example) soon becomes aware of this (pall/pole). This includes the village of Paull.

== Notable people ==
Most of the notable people associated with the city can be found in the People from Kingston upon Hull and People associated with the University of Hull categories.

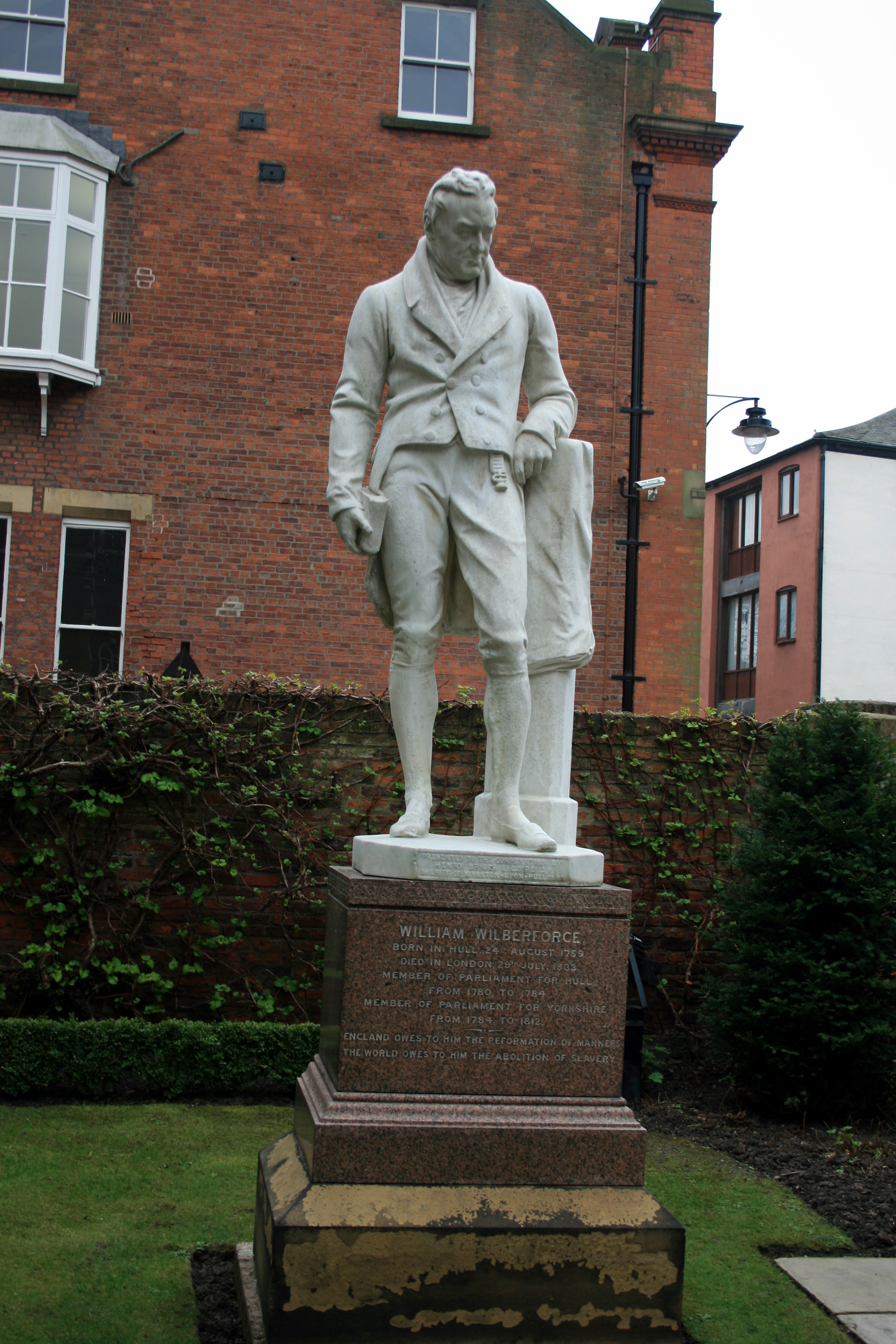
Statue of William Wilberforce, Wilberforce House, Hull

People from Hull are called "Hullensians" and the city has been the birthplace and home to many notable people. Amongst those of historic significance with a connection to Hull are former city MP William Wilberforce who was instrumental in the abolition of slavery and Amy Johnson, aviator who was the first woman to fly solo from England to Australia.

Hullensian entertainers include Dorothy Mackaill, 1950s singer David Whitfield, sports commentator Tony Green, actors Sir Tom Courtenay, Ian Carmichael, John Alderton, actress Maureen Lipman and Reece Shearsmith. Playwrights Richard Bean, John Godber and Alan Plater have close connections with Hull.

Notable Hullensian musicians include Paul Heaton of the bands The Housemartins and The Beautiful South, guitarist Mick Ronson and bassist Trevor Bolder, who worked with David Bowie and best known for his long association with London's Uriah Heep, and 2000s indie rock band The Paddingtons. Verulamian rock band Enter Shikari has a song called "the Paddington Frisk", named after the 2000s Hullensian rock band. Other Hullensian bands include Red Guitars, the Rats, Nyam Nyam, the Favours, Fonda 500, the Aces and the Planet Wilson.

The astrophysicist Edward Arthur Milne and logician John Venn both hailed from Hull. The poet Philip Larkin lived in Hull for 30 years and wrote much of his mature work in the city. An earlier poet, Andrew Marvell represented the city in Parliament during the 17th century. Artist David Remfry RA studied at Hull College of Art before moving to London and New York.

Chemist George Gray, who had a 45-year career at the university, developed the first stable liquid crystals that became an immediate success for the screens of all sorts of electronic gadgets.

Robert Russell Race (1907–1984), medical doctor and human geneticist, was born in Hull.

Notable sportspeople include Ebenezer Cobb Morley (16 August 1831 – 20 November 1924), an English sportsman who is regarded as the father of the Football Association and modern football. Clive Sullivan, rugby league player, who played for both of Hull's professional rugby league teams, was the first black Briton to captain any national representative team. The main A63 road into the city from the Humber Bridge is named Clive Sullivan Way in his honour. Nick Barmby played for Tottenham Hotspur, Middlesbrough, Everton, Liverpool, and Leeds United before returning to play for his hometown club Hull City. He also won 23 England caps and played in the famous 5–1 victory over Germany in 2001. Another footballer is Dean Windass, who had two spells with Hull City.

Hull-born Karl Bushby is a British author and ex-paratrooper, walking from Punta Arenas to Hull.

On accepting a peerage, Welsh-born Baron Prescott of Kingston-upon-Hull (former MP and Deputy Prime Minister John Prescott) took his title from his adopted home city of Hull.

== International relations ==
Hull has formal twinning arrangements with:

- Chișinău, Moldova
- Freetown, Sierra Leone
- Fengtai, Beijing, China
- Niigata, Japan
- Raleigh, North Carolina, United States
- Reykjavík, Iceland
- Rotterdam, Netherlands
- Szczecin, Poland

The following cities are named directly after Hull:

- Hull, Massachusetts, United States
- Hull, Quebec, Canada

== Freedom of the City ==
The following people and military units have received the Freedom of the City of Kingston upon Hull.

=== Individuals ===
- Desmond Tutu: 2 July 1987.
- Helen Suzman: 2 July 1987.
- Nelson Mandela: 2 July 1987.
- John Prescott: 1 August 1996.
- Kevin McNamara: 16 January 1997.
- Jean Bishop – "Bee Lady": 23 November 2017.
- Sir Thomas Courtenay: 18 January 2018.
- Yvonne Blenkinsop: 15 November 2018.
- Carol Thomas: 22 September 2022.
- Patrick Doyle: 17 November 2022.
- Tommy Coyle:19 November 2025.
- Neil Hudgell:19 November 2025.

=== Military units ===
- The East Yorkshire Regiment: 1 June 1944.
- The Prince of Wales's Own Regiment of Yorkshire: 20 February 1959. (Note: Extended from East Yorkshire Regiment)
- The Yorkshire Regiment: 16 November 2006. (Note: Transferred from East Yorkshire Regiment via Prince of Wales's Own Regiment of Yorkshire)
- 440 (Humber) light Anti-Aircraft Regiment Royal Artillery (TA): 24 September 1960.
- 440 (Humber) light Anti-Aircraft Regiment Royal Artillery (Territorials): 3 August 1967.
- RAF Patrington: 16 May 1970.
- 150(N) Transport Regiment Royal Corps of Transport (Volunteers): 1 February 1990.
- RRH Staxton Wold: 3 March 1994.
- 150 (Yorkshire) Transport Regiment Royal Logistic Corps (Volunteers): 3 March 1994.
- HMS Iron Duke, RN: 3 March 1994.
- 250th Field Ambulance (Volunteer Unit): 15 July 1999.
- Hull Unit Sea Cadet Corps: 27 February 2014.
- Humberside and South Yorkshire Army Cadet Force: 21 March 2024.
- 152 (City of Hull) Squadron Air Training Corps: 21 March 2024.

== See also ==
- Grade I listed churches in the East Riding of Yorkshire
- History of the Jews in Hull
- Hull triple trawler tragedy (1968)
- Land of Green Ginger
- List of Jews from Kingston upon Hull
- Rollits LLP
- Sculcoates power station

== Notes ==
^{a} There was no census in 1941: figures are from National Register. United Kingdom and Isle of Man. Statistics of Population on 29 September 1939 by Sex, Age and Marital Condition.
^{b} The Hull Daily Mail article indicates the 1991 population was 254,117.
^{c} There is a discrepancy of 6 between Office for National Statistics figures (quoted before) and those on the Vision of Britain website (quoted here).
^{d} The Hull Daily Mail article indicates the 2001 population was 246,355.
