= Hull City Council elections =

UK local elections

Hull City Council elections are held three years out of every four to elect members of Hull City Council, the unitary authority which governs the city of Kingston upon Hull in the East Riding of Yorkshire, England. Since the last boundary changes in 2018, the council has comprised 57 councillors representing 21 wards with each ward electing either 2 or 3 councillors.

== Results ==
Local election results for Hull City Council, 1968–2000. Legend: Labour Liberal/Alliance Liberal Democrat Conservative Independent Independent Labour Uncontested

Until 2002, with the exception of the period 1969–71, the council had been led by Labour since 1945. They again led the council as a minority administration between 2003 and 2006. Between the 2006 election and 2011 election Hull City Council was led by a Liberal Democrat administration, originally as a minority administration. The Liberal Democrats first gained overall control of the council after the 2007 election. In the 2011 election Labour regained control of the council following the collapse of the Liberal Democrat vote. In the 2012 election Labour increased the number of seats they held. In the 2014 election two Labour councillors formed an "Independent Labour Group" in protest against their own party's budget plans, off-setting the two seats gained by Labour in the election. In the 2018 election all seats were contested because of boundary changes and the Liberal Democrat vote rose gaining seats on Labour who held on to control, with their worst result since 2010. The 2019 election saw just 2 seats change hands leaving the composition of the council unchanged.

Elections in 2020 were postponed for a year due to the COVID-19 pandemic. The 2021 election saw Labour lose a seat, while the Liberal Democrats gained two. On 3 March 2022, Labour councillor Julia Conner defected to the Liberal Democrats, reducing the Labour majority to one. Two weeks later, it was announced that another Labour Councillor, Sean Chaytor, would be standing as an independent candidate against Labour in the upcoming 2022 local elections. The Liberal Democrats won overall control of the City Council in the 2022 local elections to end ten years of Labour rule. On 23 March 2023, Labour councillor Aneesa Akbar resigned as a councillor for the Central Ward, triggering a by-election that took place on 4 May 2023, the same day as the UK local elections. The 2023 local elections saw the Liberal Democrats returned with an increased majority. Sarah Harper was suspended as a councillor on 7 August 2023 after failing to attend a council meeting in 6 months due to health issues and the birth of her first daughter, triggering a by-election in her Bricknell ward. Labour held the ward in the by-election with Sharon Hofman elected. On 8 January 2024, Cllr Marjorie Brabazon for the Avenues Ward resigned as a councillor, triggering a by-election, with University councillor and former Lord Mayor Steve Wilson resigning the Labour whip the next day citing: "It became a toxic environment, but I'm free of it now". He continued to sit as an independent, until 26 March 2024 when he withdrew his accusation and offered his apology. He regained the Labour whip, but stood-down at the May 2024 election for health reasons.

Year	Liberal Democrat	Labour	Conservative	Reform	UKIP	Others	Reference	Controlling Party
2026	26	16	0	10	0	5		No Overall Control
2024	31	26	0	0	0	0		Liberal Democrat
2023	32	25	0	0	0	0		Liberal Democrat
2022	29	27	0	0	0	0		Liberal Democrat
2021	26	30	1	0	0	0		Labour
2019	24	31	2	0	0	0		Labour
2018	24	31	2	0	0	0	(Note: The whole council was up for election with boundary changes since the last election in 2016 reducing the number of seats by 2.)	Labour
2016	17	39	2	0	1	0		Labour
2015	15	40	2	0	1	1		Labour
2014	15	39	2	0	1	2		Labour
2012	17	39	2	0	0	1		Labour
2011	22	34	2	0	0	1		Labour
2010	33	22	2	0	0	2		Liberal Democrat
2008	33	19	3	0	0	4		Liberal Democrat
2007	30	20	3	0	0	6		Liberal Democrat
2006	26	25	2	0	0	6		No Overall Control
2004	24	27	2	0	1	5		No Overall Control
2003	21	28	2	0	0	8		No Overall Control
2002	29	24	2	0	0	4	(Note: The whole council was up for election with boundary changes since the last election in 2000 reducing the number of seats by 1.)	No Overall Control
2000	10	44	2	0	0	4		Labour
1999	4	51	1	0	0	4		Labour

== Council elections ==
=== Non-metropolitan district elections ===
- 1973 Hull City Council election
- 1976 Hull City Council election
- 1979 Hull City Council election
- 1983 Hull City Council election (New ward boundaries)
- 1984 Hull City Council election
- 1986 Hull City Council election
- 1987 Hull City Council election
- 1988 Hull City Council election
- 1990 Hull City Council election
- 1991 Hull City Council election
- 1992 Hull City Council election
- 1994 Hull City Council election

=== Unitary authority elections ===
- 1995 Hull City Council election
- 1998 Hull City Council election
- 1999 Hull City Council election
- 2000 Hull City Council election
- 2002 Hull City Council election (New ward boundaries reduced the number of seats by one)
- 2003 Hull City Council election
- 2004 Hull City Council election
- 2006 Hull City Council election
- 2007 Hull City Council election
- 2008 Hull City Council election
- 2010 Hull City Council election
- 2011 Hull City Council election
- 2012 Hull City Council election
- 2014 Hull City Council election
- 2015 Hull City Council election
- 2016 Hull City Council election
- 2018 Hull City Council election (New ward boundaries reduced the number of seats by two)
- 2019 Hull City Council election
- 2021 Hull City Council election (postponed from 2020 because of COVID-19 pandemic)
- 2022 Hull City Council election
- 2023 Hull City Council election
- 2024 Hull City Council election
- 2026 Hull City Council election

== Wards ==
=== 2002–2018 ===
Hull wards 2002–2018

Ward	Area	Map	No. councillors
Avenue	Wyke	19	3
Beverley	Northern	15	2
Boothferry	West	22	3
Bransholme East	North Carr	12	2
Bransholme West	North Carr	13	2
Bricknell	Wyke	20	2
Derringham	West	21	3
Drypool	Riverside	4	3
Holderness	Park	10	3
Ings	East	9	3
Kings Park	North Carr	14	2
Longhill	East	8	3
Marfleet	Park	5	3
Myton	Riverside	3	3
Newington	Riverside	23	3
Newland	Wyke	18	2
Orchard Park & Greenwood	Northern	16	3
Pickering	West	1	3
Southcoates East	Park	7	2
Southcoates West	Park	6	2
St Andrews	Riverside	2	2
Sutton	East	11	3
University	Northern	17	2

=== 2018– ===
Hull wards 2018–

Ward	Area	Map	No. councillors
Avenue	Wyke	18	3
Beverley and Newland	Northern	14	3
Boothferry	West	21	3
Bricknell	Wyke	19	2
Central	Wyke	17	2
Derringham	West	20	3
Drypool	Riverside	4	3
Holderness	Park	9	3
Ings	East	8	2
Kingswood	Foredyke	13	2
Longhill and Bilton Grange	East	7	3
Marfleet	Park	6	3
Newington and Gipsyville	Riverside	2	3
North Carr	Foredyke	11	3
Orchard Park	Northern	15	3
Pickering	West	1	2
Southcoates	Park	5	3
St Andrews and Docklands	Riverside	3	3
Sutton	East	10	3
University	Northern	16	2
West Carr	Foredyke	12	3

== By-election results ==
=== 1995–1998 ===
Avenue by-election 13 March 1997
Party	Candidate	Votes	%	±%
Labour		1,422	48.0	
Liberal Democrats		1,329	45.0	
Conservative		157	5.0	
Independent Labour		42	2.0	
Majority		93	3.0	
Turnout		2,950	29.5	
Labour hold		Swing		

=== 1998–2002 ===
Ings by-election 8 February 2001
Party	Candidate	Votes	%	±%
Labour		730	56.2	−6.7
Liberal Democrats		370	28.5	+11.2
Conservative		156	12.0	−7.8
Majority		360	27.7	
Turnout		1,256	14.5	
Labour hold		Swing		

University by-election 8 February 2001
Party	Candidate	Votes	%	±%
Labour		701	40.8	−17.0
Liberal Democrats		644	37.5	+23.3
Conservative		279	16.2	−4.1
Independent Labour		76	4.4	−3.2
Socialist Labour		18	1.0	+1.0
Majority		57	3.3	
Turnout		1,718	21.0	
Labour hold		Swing		

=== 2002–2006 ===
Marfleet by-election 14 November 2002
Party	Candidate	Votes	%	±%
Labour	Sean Chaytor	1,026	57.0	−14.2
Liberal Democrats		705	39.1	+10.3
Conservative		47	2.6	+2.6
UKIP		23	1.3	+1.3
Majority		321	17.9	
Turnout		1,801	20.2	
Labour hold		Swing		

Derringham by-election 13 January 2005
Party	Candidate	Votes	%	±%
Liberal Democrats	Michael Rouse-Deane	927	38.7	+29.7
Independent	John Considine	679	28.3	−0.1
Labour	Alan Gardiner	353	14.7	−11.1
UKIP	John Cornforth	320	13.4	−15.1
BNP	Paul Buckley	116	4.8	
Majority		248	10.4	
Turnout		2,395	27.0	
Liberal Democrats gain from UKIP		Swing		

Beverley by-election 13 October 2005
Party	Candidate	Votes	%	±%
Liberal Democrats	Joyce Korczak	1,375	64.5	+5.0
Labour	Andrew Whiting	382	17.9	−5.7
Conservative	Alec Dear	187	8.8	−8.2
BNP		76	3.6	+3.6
Liberal		57	2.7	+2.7
Independent		42	2.0	+2.0
Veritas		13	0.6	+0.6
Majority		993	46.6	
Turnout		2,132		
Liberal Democrats hold		Swing		

=== 2006–2010 ===
Drypool by-election 8 January 2009
Party	Candidate	Votes	%	±%
Liberal Democrats	Linda Chambers	1,306	52.3	−11.6
Labour	Gary Wareing	891	35.7	+7.9
National Front	Mike Cooper	184	7.4	+7.4
Conservative	Andrew Allison	117	4.7	−3.7
Majority		415	16.61	
Turnout		2,498	26.70	
Liberal Democrats gain from Conservative		Swing		

=== 2018–2022 ===
St Andrew's and Docklands by-election 5 September 2019
Party	Candidate	Votes	%	±%
Labour	Leanne Fudge	837	45.6	−7.8
Liberal Democrats	Tracey Henry	805	43.9	+30.8
Conservative	Daniel Bond	193	10.5	+2.7
Majority		32	1.7	
Turnout		1,835		
Labour hold		Swing		

=== 2022–2026 ===
Bricknell by-election 21 September 2023
Party	Candidate	Votes	%	±%
Labour	Sharon Hofman	919	43.7	−9.0
Liberal Democrats	Lucy Lennon	647	30.8	+25.3
Conservative	John Fareham	330	19.9	−15.9
Green	Kevin Paulson	98	4.7	−1.3
Yorkshire	James Steele	19	0.9	+0.9
Majority		272	12.9	
Turnout		2,013		
Labour hold		Swing		

Avenue by-election 15 February 2024
Party	Candidate	Votes	%	±%
Liberal Democrats	Rhiannon Beeson	1,186	45.7	+9.7
Labour	Karen Wood	1,029	39.7	−11.3
Green	James Russell	198	7.6	−2.5
Independent	Michael Whale	139	5.4	+5.4
Conservative	Alex Hayward	43	1.7	−1.2
Majority		157	6.1	
Turnout		2,595		
Liberal Democrats gain from Labour		Swing		
