= 2012 Hull City Council election =

2012 UK local government election

| ← 2011 | 3 May 2012 | 2014 → |

20 seats (of the 53) to Hull City Council 27 seats needed for a majority
| | First party | Second party | Third party |
|---|---|---|---|
| Leader | Stephen Brady | Abigail Bell | John Fareham |
| Party | Labour | Liberal Democrats | Conservative |
| Leader's seat | Southcoates West | Pickering | Bricknell |
| Last election | 34 seats, 54.2% | 22 seats, 30.4% | 2 seats, 6.9% |
| Seats after | 39 | 17 | 2 |
| Seat change | ▲5 | ▼5 | - |
| Popular vote | 22,714 | 13,566 | 2,693 |
| Percentage | 53.3% | 31.9% | 6.3% |
| Swing | ▼0.9% | ▲1.5% | ▼0.6% |
- Map of the results of the 2012 Hull council election. Labour in red, Liberal Democrats in yellow, Conservatives in blue, Uncontested in cream.
Council Leader before election
Stephen Brady
Labour
Elected Council Leader
Stephen Brady
Labour

The 2012 Hull City Council election took place on 3 May 2012 to elect members of Hull City Council in England. This was held on the same day as other 2012 United Kingdom local elections. One third of the council was up for election and Labour retained control of the council with an increased majority.

== Ward results ==
No elections were held in Bransholme East, Bransholme West and University wards.

=== Avenue ===
Avenue
| Party | Candidate | Votes | % | ±% |
|---|---|---|---|---|
| Labour | Rosie Nicola | 1,348 | 41.2 | |
| Liberal Democrats | John Graham Robinson | 1,089 | 33.3 | |
| Green | Martin Deane | 513 | 15.7 | |
| UKIP | Stan Smith | 201 | 6.1 | |
| Conservative | Alexander David Hayward | 120 | 3.7 | |
| Majority | | 259 | 7.9 | |
| Turnout | | 3,277 | 33.9 | |
| Labour gain from Liberal Democrats | | Swing | | |

=== Beverley ===
Beverley
| Party | Candidate | Votes | % | ±% |
|---|---|---|---|---|
| Liberal Democrats | Karen Mathieson | 1,484 | 59.0 | |
| Labour | Leanne Fudge | 612 | 24.3 | |
| UKIP | Vicky Butler | 348 | 13.8 | |
| Conservative | Andrew Neil Forster | 70 | 2.8 | |
| Majority | | 872 | 34.5 | |
| Turnout | | 2,524 | 37.2 | |
| Liberal Democrats hold | | Swing | | |

=== Boothferry ===
Boothferry
| Party | Candidate | Votes | % | ±% |
|---|---|---|---|---|
| Liberal Democrats | Helena Woods | 1,196 | 43.8 | |
| Labour Co-op | Theresa Elizabeth Vaughan | 1,123 | 41.2 | |
| UKIP | Brian Shepherd | 308 | 11.3 | |
| Conservative | Craig William Ulliott | 101 | 3.7 | |
| Majority | | 73 | 2.7 | |
| Turnout | | 2,733 | 28.5 | |
| Liberal Democrats hold | | Swing | | |

=== Bricknell ===
Bricknell
| Party | Candidate | Votes | % | ±% |
|---|---|---|---|---|
| Conservative | John Francis Abbott | 928 | 43.2 | |
| Labour | Karen Jane Rouse-Deane | 803 | 37.4 | |
| UKIP | Mike Hookem | 234 | 10.9 | |
| Green | Michael John Lammiman | 101 | 4.7 | |
| Liberal Democrats | Motokin Ali | 80 | 3.7 | |
| Majority | | 125 | 5.8 | |
| Turnout | | 2,155 | 32.9 | |
| Conservative hold | | Swing | | |

=== Derringham ===
Derringham
| Party | Candidate | Votes | % | ±% |
|---|---|---|---|---|
| Liberal Democrats | Eliza Mann | 1,047 | 44.0 | |
| Labour | Rob Dunstan | 949 | 39.9 | |
| UKIP | John Henry Cornforth | 301 | 12.7 | |
| Conservative | James Alliott | 81 | 3.4 | |
| Majority | | 98 | 4.1 | |
| Turnout | | 2,381 | 26.4 | |
| Liberal Democrats hold | | Swing | | |

=== Drypool ===
Drypool
| Party | Candidate | Votes | % | ±% |
|---|---|---|---|---|
| Liberal Democrats | Adam Williams | 1,523 | 52.6 | |
| Labour | Mike Thompson | 1,180 | 40.7 | |
| National Front | Stuart Moses | 133 | 4.6 | |
| Conservative | Steph Corke | 60 | 2.1 | |
| Majority | | 343 | 11.8 | |
| Turnout | | 2,909 | 30.3 | |
| Liberal Democrats hold | | Swing | | |

=== Holderness ===
Holderness
| Party | Candidate | Votes | % | ±% |
|---|---|---|---|---|
| Labour | Gill Kennett | 1,481 | 48.7 | |
| Liberal Democrats | Jackie Dad | 1,447 | 47.5 | |
| Conservative | John Mathew Crompton | 116 | 3.8 | |
| Majority | | 34 | 1.1 | |
| Turnout | | 3,044 | 30.0 | |
| Labour gain from Liberal Democrats | | Swing | | |

=== Ings ===
Ings
| Party | Candidate | Votes | % | ±% |
|---|---|---|---|---|
| Labour | Suzanne Armstrong | 1,879 | 71.2 | |
| Liberal Democrats | Christine Gurevitch | 349 | 13.2 | |
| National Front | Nick Walsh | 241 | 9.1 | |
| Conservative | Philip David MacKay | 169 | 6.4 | |
| Majority | | 1,530 | 57.9 | |
| Turnout | | 2,642 | 28.0 | |
| Labour gain from Liberal Democrats | | Swing | | |

=== Kings Park ===
Kings Park
| Party | Candidate | Votes | % | ±% |
|---|---|---|---|---|
| Liberal Democrats | Charles Quinn | 973 | 48.5 | |
| Labour | Gwen Lunn | 945 | 47.1 | |
| Conservative | Colin Robert Baxter | 89 | 4.4 | |
| Majority | | 28 | 1.4 | |
| Turnout | | 2,017 | 26.2 | |
| Liberal Democrats hold | | Swing | | |

=== Longhill ===
Longhill
| Party | Candidate | Votes | % | ±% |
|---|---|---|---|---|
| Labour | John Allen Hewitt | 1,539 | 82.8 | |
| Liberal Democrats | Elaine Lesley Keal | 177 | 9.5 | |
| Conservative | Leslie Harry Fisher | 143 | 7.7 | |
| Majority | | 1,362 | 72.5 | |
| Turnout | | 1,878 | 21.6 | |
| Labour hold | | Swing | | |

=== Marfleet ===
Marfleet
| Party | Candidate | Votes | % | ±% |
|---|---|---|---|---|
| Labour | Sheila Waudby | 1,510 | 87.7 | |
| Liberal Democrats | Tracey Neal | 108 | 6.3 | |
| Conservative | Richard James Munslow | 104 | 6.0 | |
| Majority | | 1,402 | 80.9 | |
| Turnout | | 1,734 | 18.8 | |
| Labour hold | | Swing | | |

=== Myton ===
Myton
| Party | Candidate | Votes | % | ±% |
|---|---|---|---|---|
| Labour | Colin Inglis | 1,107 | 61.5 | |
| UKIP | Ken Hordon | 361 | 20.1 | |
| Liberal Democrats | Steven Carter | 157 | 8.7 | |
| Conservative | Adam Vaughan | 105 | 5.8 | |
| National Front | Nigel Piggins | 70 | 3.9 | |
| Majority | | 746 | 41.0 | |
| Turnout | | 1,819 | 18.3 | |
| Labour hold | | Swing | | |

=== Newington ===
Newington
| Party | Candidate | Votes | % | ±% |
|---|---|---|---|---|
| Labour | Helena Jane Spencer | 1,040 | 74.2 | |
| Liberal Democrats | Rick Welton | 269 | 19.2 | |
| Conservative | David Thompson | 92 | 6.6 | |
| Majority | | 771 | 54.7 | |
| Turnout | | 1,409 | 17.8 | |
| Labour gain from Liberal Democrats | | Swing | | |

=== Newland ===
Newland
| Party | Candidate | Votes | % | ±% |
|---|---|---|---|---|
| Liberal Democrats | Mike Ross | 883 | 58.2 | |
| Labour Co-op | Brian Leslie Navier | 426 | 28.1 | |
| Green | James Edward Russell | 119 | 7.8 | |
| Conservative | Sam Lee | 89 | 5.9 | |
| Majority | | 457 | 29.8 | |
| Turnout | | 1,536 | 19.2 | |
| Liberal Democrats hold | | Swing | | |

=== Orchard Park & Greenwood ===
Orchard Park & Greenwood
| Party | Candidate | Votes | % | ±% |
|---|---|---|---|---|
| Labour Co-op | Stephen James Bayes | 1,267 | 77.9 | |
| UKIP | Tony Morfitt | 219 | 13.5 | |
| Liberal Democrats | Chris Randall | 92 | 5.7 | |
| Conservative | David Triffitt Whellan | 48 | 3.0 | |
| Majority | | 1,048 | 64.1 | |
| Turnout | | 1,636 | 17.8 | |
| Labour Co-op hold | | Swing | | |

=== Pickering ===
Pickering
| Party | Candidate | Votes | % | ±% |
|---|---|---|---|---|
| Liberal Democrats | Claire Thomas | 1,489 | 52.7 | |
| Labour | Sharon Belcher | 984 | 34.8 | |
| UKIP | Peter Mawer | 281 | 9.9 | |
| Conservative | Daniel Mark Bond | 73 | 2.6 | |
| Majority | | 505 | 17.8 | |
| Turnout | | 2,837 | 31.4 | |
| Liberal Democrats hold | | Swing | | |

=== Southcoates East ===
Southcoates East
| Party | Candidate | Votes | % | ±% |
|---|---|---|---|---|
| Labour | Tom Mcvie | 1,013 | 88.5 | |
| Liberal Democrats | Elizabeth Neil | 71 | 6.2 | |
| Conservative | Samuel Gary Beckton | 61 | 5.3 | |
| Majority | | 942 | 81.0 | |
| Turnout | | 1163 | 19.9 | |
| Labour hold | | Swing | | |

=== Southcoates West ===
Southcoates West
| Party | Candidate | Votes | % | ±% |
|---|---|---|---|---|
| Labour Co-op | Mary Elizabeth Glew | 1,036 | 78.5 | |
| UKIP | Julian Marcus Penna | 109 | 8.3 | |
| National Front | Mike Cooper | 66 | 5.0 | |
| Liberal Democrats | Michael Chambers | 58 | 4.4 | |
| Conservative | Nikki Knowles | 50 | 3.8 | |
| Majority | | 927 | 70.1 | |
| Turnout | | 1,323 | 22.1 | |
| Labour Co-op hold | | Swing | | |

=== St Andrews ===
St Andrews
| Party | Candidate | Votes | % | ±% |
|---|---|---|---|---|
| Labour Co-op | Daren Russell Hale | 866 | 83.4 | |
| Liberal Democrats | Tracey Henry | 97 | 9.3 | |
| Conservative | Bob Cook | 75 | 7.2 | |
| Majority | | 769 | 73.0 | |
| Turnout | | 1,053 | 18.3 | |
| Labour Co-op hold | | Swing | | |

=== Sutton ===
Sutton
| Party | Candidate | Votes | % | ±% |
|---|---|---|---|---|
| Labour | Ken Turner | 1,606 | 59.4 | |
| Liberal Democrats | Kalvin Neal | 977 | 36.2 | |
| Conservative | Christopher David Oakley | 119 | 4.4 | |
| Majority | | 629 | 23.2 | |
| Turnout | | 2,714 | 28.0 | |
| Labour gain from Liberal Democrats | | Swing | | |

== Results ==
Summary of the 3 May 2012 Hull City Council election results

| Parties | Last election: 2011 | Uncontested Seats | Seats for Election | Elected | Gains | Losses | Result | Votes | Share | | | | | | | | | | |
|---|---|---|---|---|---|---|---|---|---|---|---|---|---|---|---|---|---|---|---|
| Parties | Last election: 2011 | Uncontested Seats | Seats for Election | Elected | Gains | Losses | Result | Votes | Share | Labour | 34 | 27 | 7 | 12 | ▲5 | - | 39 | 22,714 | 53.3% |
| Liberal Democrats | 22 | 10 | 12 | 7 | ▼5 | - | 17 | 13,566 | 31.9% | | | | | | | | | | |
| Conservative | 2 | 1 | 1 | 1 | - | - | 2 | 2,693 | 6.3% | | | | | | | | | | |
| Independent | 1 | 1 | 0 | 0 | - | - | 1 | 0 | 0% | | | | | | | | | | |
| UKIP | 0 | 0 | 0 | 0 | - | - | 0 | 2,362 | 5.5% | | | | | | | | | | |
| Green | 0 | 0 | 0 | 0 | - | - | 0 | 733 | 1.7% | | | | | | | | | | |
| National Front | 0 | 0 | 0 | 0 | - | - | 0 | 510 | 1.2% | | | | | | | | | | |
