= 2018 Hull City Council election =

2018 UK local government election

Results of the 2018 Hull City Council election

The 2018 Hull City Council election took place on 3 May 2018 to elect members of Hull City Council in England. This was on the same day as other nationwide local elections. Following a review of Ward boundaries by the Local Government Boundary Commission for England (LGBCE) the whole council was up for election as the number of councillors was reduced by two and boundaries of all seats redrawn. The Labour party was defending overall control of the council, which they achieved but with a greatly reduced majority.

This result had the following consequences for the total number of seats on the Council after the elections:

Party	Previous council	New council	+/-
Labour	39	31	▼8
Liberal Democrats	17	24	▲7
Conservatives	2	2	Steady
UKIP	1	0	▼1
Total	59	57	
Working majority	19	5	

== Results summary ==
Hull City Council election, 2018
Party	Seats	Gains	Losses	Net gain/loss	Seats %	Votes %	Votes	+/−
Labour	31	0	8	▼8	54.4	48.9	58,444	
Liberal Democrats	24	7	0	▲7	42.1	36.67	43,822	
Conservative	2	0	0	Steady	3.5	11.49	13,735	
Green	0	0	0	Steady	0	1.33	1,594	
UKIP	0	0	1	▼1	0	0.5	596	
Independent	0	0	0	Steady	0	1.1	1,309	

The votes and percentage expressed above for Independent is a combination of votes cast for candidates described as Independent, Democrats and Veterans Party, The Yorkshire Party and where no description was provided on the official declaration of candidature or result.

== Ward results ==
An asterisk * indicates an incumbent for one of the former wards who stood for re-election.

Turnout figures where stated are the number of ballot papers handed out in a ward including any rejected ballot papers.

=== Avenue ===
Avenue
Party	Candidate	Votes	%	±%
Labour	Marjorie Brabazon*	1,910	45.9	
Liberal Democrats	Abigail Bell	1,847	44.4	
Liberal Democrats	John Robinson*	1,813	43.6	
Labour	Abhimanyu Ranawat	1,760	42.3	
Liberal Democrats	Elspeth McCobb	1,727	41.5	
Labour	Antonia O'Mullane	1,686	40.5	
Green	Martin Deane	647	15.5	
Conservative	Alexander Hayward	198	4.8	
Conservative	William Sharpe	162	3.9	
Conservative	Alistair Lamyman	150	3.6	
Majority				
Turnout		4,163	43	
Labour win (new seat)				
Liberal Democrats win (new seat)				
Liberal Democrats win (new seat)				

=== Beverley and Newland ===
Beverley and Newland
Party	Candidate	Votes	%	±%
Liberal Democrats	David McCobb*	2,068	61.3	
Liberal Democrats	Mike Ross*	2,029	60.1	
Liberal Democrats	Paul Drake-Davis	1,955	57.9	
Labour Co-op	George Aylett	913	27.0	
Labour Co-op	Karen Wood	839	24.9	
Labour Co-op	Saffron Scaife	824	24.4	
Green	Michael Lammiman	251	7.4	
Conservative	John Manners	203	6.0	
Conservative	Salman Anwar	194	5.7	
Conservative	Joshua McMullen	188	5.6	
Majority				
Turnout		3,376	33	
Liberal Democrats win (new seat)				
Liberal Democrats win (new seat)				
Liberal Democrats win (new seat)				

=== Boothferry ===
Boothferry
Party	Candidate	Votes	%	±%
Liberal Democrats	Maria Coward*	1,269	49.0	
Liberal Democrats	Alison Thompson	1,115	43.0	
Liberal Democrats	Suzanne Tompsett-Ince	1,112	42.9	
Labour	Amber Goodwin	949	36.6	
Labour	Patrick Wilkinson	889	34.3	
Labour	Salinder Supri	863	33.3	
Conservative	Charles Dinsdale	362	14.0	
Conservative	John Sharp	317	12.2	
Conservative	Owen McConaghy	285	11.0	
Green	Christopher Douglas	139	5.4	
Democrats and Veterans Party	Ben Morgan	110	4.2	
Majority				
Turnout		2,592	27.8	
Liberal Democrats win (new seat)				
Liberal Democrats win (new seat)				
Liberal Democrats win (new seat)				

=== Bricknell ===
Bricknell
Party	Candidate	Votes	%	±%
Conservative	John Fareham*	1,172	47.0	
Conservative	John Abbott*	1,141	45.7	
Labour	Steven Graham	1,091	43.7	
Labour	Lauren Taylor	993	39.8	
Liberal Democrats	Lee Fallin	117	4.7	
Liberal Democrats	Sarita Robinson	110	4.4	
UKIP	Mark Angelides	66	2.6	
The Yorkshire Party	Alexis Blakeston	57	2.3	
Majority				
Turnout		2,495	39	
Conservative win (new seat)				
Conservative win (new seat)				

=== Central ===
Central
Party	Candidate	Votes	%	±%
Labour	Aneesa Akbar	962	54.0	
Labour	Shane McMurray	886	49.7	
Liberal Democrats	Jurgita Kirtikliene	572	32.1	
Liberal Democrats	James Melling	513	28.8	
Conservative	Oliver Harris	116	6.5	
Green	Sophia Sutherland	112	6.3	
Conservative	Warren Wilkinson	105	5.9	
Majority				
Turnout		1,782	26.9	
Labour win (new seat)				
Labour win (new seat)				

=== Derringham ===
Derringham
Party	Candidate	Votes	%	±%
Liberal Democrats	Cheryl Payne*	1,416	55.1	
Liberal Democrats	Julie Greenhill	1,311	51.0	
Liberal Democrats	Ryan Langley*	1,291	50.3	
Labour Co-op	Alan Clark	806	31.4	
Labour Co-op	Leanne Fudge*	797	31.0	
Labour Co-op	Dean Kirk	755	29.4	
Independent	Derek French	208	8.1	
Conservative	Andrew Forster	206	8.0	
Conservative	Eleonor Whitehead	191	7.4	
UKIP	Michael Whitehead	172	6.7	
Conservative	Lucy Whitehead	167	6.5	
Majority				
Turnout		2,570	27	
Liberal Democrats win (new seat)				
Liberal Democrats win (new seat)				
Liberal Democrats win (new seat)				

=== Drypool ===
Drypool
Party	Candidate	Votes	%	±%
Liberal Democrats	Linda Chambers*	1,751	62.5	
Liberal Democrats	Adam Williams*	1,739	62.1	
Liberal Democrats	Diana Hatcher*	1,685	60.2	
Labour	Tracy Dearing	729	26.0	
Labour	Olajide Williams	713	25.5	
Labour	Kevin Horler	688	24.6	
Conservative	Thomas Higgins	155	5.5	
Conservative	Jordan Tyndall	152	5.4	
Conservative	Daniel Kupusarevic	136	4.9	
Green	John Allison-Walsh	133	4.8	
Democrats and Veterans Party	Robert Hudson	98	3.5	
Majority				
Turnout		2,800	30.5	
Liberal Democrats win (new seat)				
Liberal Democrats win (new seat)				
Liberal Democrats win (new seat)				

=== Holderness ===
Holderness
Party	Candidate	Votes	%	±%
Liberal Democrats	Jacqueline Dad*	1,491	53.6	
Liberal Democrats	Linda Tock*	1,309	47.0	
Liberal Democrats	Kalvin Neal	1,251	45.0	
Labour	Christopher Sumpton*	1,117	40.1	
Labour	Sara Rookyard	1,027	36.9	
Labour	Rachel Edwards	998	35.9	
UKIP	Michael Hookem	177	6.4	
Conservative	David Staniforth	163	5.9	
Conservative	Melissa Love	154	5.5	
Green	Kevin Paulson	110	4.0	
Conservative	Craig Ulliott	106	3.8	
Majority				
Turnout		2,783	30.4	
Liberal Democrats win (new seat)				
Liberal Democrats win (new seat)				
Liberal Democrats win (new seat)				

=== Ings ===
Ings
Party	Candidate	Votes	%	±%
Labour	Alan Gardiner*	1,081	66.6	
Labour	Denise Thompson*	1,073	66.1	
Conservative	Paul Barlow	334	20.6	
Conservative	Philip Mackay	280	17.2	
Liberal Democrats	Christopher Stubbs	188	11.6	
Liberal Democrats	Elaine Keal	165	10.2	
Majority				
Turnout		1,624	22.94	
Labour win (new seat)				
Labour win (new seat)				

=== Kingswood ===
Kingswood
Party	Candidate	Votes	%	±%
Liberal Democrats	Mark Bisbey	851	66.3	
Liberal Democrats	Charles Quinn*	832	64.8	
Labour	Sarah James	329	25.6	
Labour	Anthony Smith	304	23.7	
Conservative	Dehenna Fareham	102	7.9	
Conservative	Mark Houghton	86	6.7	
Majority				
Turnout		1,284	21.8	
Liberal Democrats win (new seat)				
Liberal Democrats win (new seat)				

=== Longhill and Bilton Grange ===
Longhill and Bilton Grange
Party	Candidate	Votes	%	±%
Labour	John Black*	1,159	64.8	
Labour	Julia Conner	1,127	63.0	
Labour	John Hewitt*	1,087	60.8	
Conservative	Malcolm Burton	362	20.2	
Conservative	David Cadwell	295	16.5	
Conservative	Nicholas Coultish	279	15.6	
Liberal Democrats	Caroline Crosby	187	10.5	
Liberal Democrats	Brian Gurevitch	161	9.0	
Liberal Democrats	Ann Gurevitch	136	7.6	
Turnout		1,788	19.43	
Labour win (new seat)				
Labour win (new seat)				
Labour win (new seat)				

=== Marfleet ===
Marfleet
Party	Candidate	Votes	%	±%
Labour	Sean Chaytor*	1,083	70.3	
Labour	Sharon Belcher*	1,061	68.9	
Labour	Rosemary Pantelakis*	959	62.2	
UKIP	Karen Hookem	181	11.7	
Conservative	Thomas Clunan	177	11.5	
Conservative	Nathan Kett	172	11.2	
Conservative	Michael Shaw	158	10.3	
Liberal Democrats	Leoni Green	157	10.2	
Independent	Maria Goddard	116	7.5	
Liberal Democrats	David Woods	103	6.7	
Liberal Democrats	Karen Woods	99	6.4	
Majority				
Turnout		1,541	16.4	
Labour win (new seat)				
Labour win (new seat)				
Labour win (new seat)				

=== Newington and Gipsyville ===
Newington and Gipsyville
Party	Candidate	Votes	%	±%
Labour	Lynda Petrini*	1,153	63.1	
Labour	Peter Allen*	1,112	60.9	
Labour	Gillian Kennett	1,053	57.6	
Liberal Democrats	Steve Carter	337	18.4	
Liberal Democrats	Rebekkah Railton	295	16.1	
Conservative	Daniel Bond	274	15.0	
Conservative	Richard Royal	262	14.3	
Conservative	Stephen Hackett	249	13.6	
Liberal Democrats	Damian Walker	249	13.6	
Majority				
Turnout		1,827	17.3	
Labour win (new seat)				
Labour win (new seat)				
Labour win (new seat)				

=== North Carr ===
North Carr
Party	Candidate	Votes	%	±%
Labour	Anita Harrison*	957	67.7	
Labour	Peter Clark*	794	56.2	
Labour	Philip Webster	714	50.5	
Liberal Democrats	Nicola Agnew	272	19.2	
Liberal Democrats	Paul Grantley	203	14.4	
Liberal Democrats	Doreen Harrison	176	12.4	
Conservative	Colin Baxter	164	11.6	
Conservative	Amy Dring	150	10.6	
Conservative	Matthew Shotton	130	9.2	
Majority				
Turnout		1,414	14.67	
Labour win (new seat)				
Labour win (new seat)				
Labour win (new seat)				

=== Orchard Park ===
Orchard Park
Party	Candidate	Votes	%	±%
Labour	Deborah Matthews	1,315	68.3	
Labour	Gwendoline Nicola	1,286	66.8	
Labour	Gary Wareing	1,212	63.0	
Liberal Democrats	Dominic Anderson	298	15.5	
Liberal Democrats	Brian Tompsett	248	12.9	
Liberal Democrats	Margaret Tompsett	238	12.4	
Conservative	Katie Hinton	228	11.9	
Conservative	Finlay Maciver	208	10.8	
Conservative	Farhana Naz-Khan	188	9.8	
Green	Benjamin Newton	150	7.8	
Majority				
Turnout		1,924	18.1	
Labour win (new seat)				
Labour win (new seat)				
Labour win (new seat)				

=== Pickering ===
Pickering
Party	Candidate	Votes	%	±%
Liberal Democrats	Holly Burton	1,189	62.7	
Liberal Democrats	Mark Ieronimo	1,143	60.3	
Labour	Paula Baxter	506	26.7	
Labour	Simon Pickering	464	24.5	
Conservative	James Chapman	185	9.8	
Conservative	Angus West	149	7.9	
Green	Theresa White	52	2.7	
Majority				
Turnout		1,897	28.52	
Liberal Democrats win (new seat)				
Liberal Democrats win (new seat)				

=== Southcoates ===
Southcoates
Party	Candidate	Votes	%	±%
Labour	Stephen Brady*	1,553	70.6	
Labour	Hester Bridges*	1,471	66.9	
Labour	Michael Thompson	1,353	61.5	
UKIP	Mark Fox	278	12.6	
Conservative	Stephen Brown	246	11.2	
Liberal Democrats	Michael Chambers	242	11.0	
Conservative	Christopher Hall	216	9.8	
Conservative	James Parker	199	9.0	
Liberal Democrats	Helena Clay	159	7.2	
Liberal Democrats	James Dad	153	7.0	
Majority				
Turnout		2,199	21.16	
Labour win (new seat)				
Labour win (new seat)				
Labour win (new seat)				

=== St Andrews and Docklands ===
St Andrews and Docklands
Party	Candidate	Votes	%	±%
Labour Co-op	Nadine Fudge*	1,357	65.9	
Labour Co-op	Daren Russell Hale*	1,297	63.0	
Labour Co-op	Haroldo Herrera-Richmond	1,252	60.8	
Conservative	Bob Cook	300	14.6	
Conservative	Nigel Hunter	273	13.3	
Liberal Democrats	Will Fielding	271	13.2	
Liberal Democrats	Tracey Henry	270	13.1	
Conservative	Edward Sumner	222	10.8	
Liberal Democrats	Zoe Gedny	200	9.7	
Independent	Richard Munslow	136	6.6	
Majority				
Turnout		2,060	19.9	
Labour Co-op win (new seat)				
Labour Co-op win (new seat)				
Labour Co-op win (new seat)				

=== Sutton ===
Sutton
Party	Candidate	Votes	%	±%
Labour	Robert Dunstan	1,362	52.6	
Labour	David Craker*	1,325	51.2	
Labour	Penelope Rodmell	1,246	48.2	
Liberal Democrats	Tracey Neal	713	27.6	
Liberal Democrats	Allen Healand	664	25.7	
Liberal Democrats	Callan Cartledge	630	24.4	
Conservative	Rebecca Rawnsley	442	17.1	
Conservative	Katie Styles	397	15.3	
Conservative	Benjamin Weeks	356	13.8	
Majority				
Turnout		2,587	24.89	
Labour win (new seat)				
Labour win (new seat)				
Labour win (new seat)				

=== University ===
University
Party	Candidate	Votes	%	±%
Labour	Gwendoline Lunn	708	49.6	
Labour	Steven Wilson*	700	49.1	
Independent	Joyce Korczak Fields*	400	28.0	
Conservative	Joshua Cass	237	16.6	
Conservative	Lewis Hudson	186	13.0	
Liberal Democrats	Janet Langton	155	10.9	
Green	Julia Brown	137	9.6	
Liberal Democrats	Patricia Shelbourne	102	7.1	
Majority				
Turnout		1,427	22.7	
Labour win (new seat)				
Labour win (new seat)				

Joyce Korczak Fields had previously won the election in University Ward in 2015 for Labour.

=== West Carr ===
West Carr
Party	Candidate	Votes	%	±%
Liberal Democrats	Robert Pritchard	1,083	45.4	
Liberal Democrats	Chris Randall	1,082	45.3	
Liberal Democrats	Christine Randall	1,080	45.2	
Labour	Neil Brown	1,062	44.5	
Labour	Hannah Freeman	887	37.2	
Labour	Terence Geraghty	844	35.4	
Independent	Colin Worrall	184	7.7	
Conservative	Leslie Fisher	183	7.7	
Conservative	Martin Goodman	175	7.3	
Conservative	Alexander Jones	174	7.3	
Majority				
Turnout		2,387	25	
Liberal Democrats win (new seat)				
Liberal Democrats win (new seat)				
Liberal Democrats win (new seat)				
