= 2010 Hull City Council election =

2010 UK local government election

Map of the results of the 2010 Hull council election. Labour in red, Liberal Democrats in yellow, Conservatives in blue, Independent in grey, Uncontested in cream.

The 2010 Hull City Council election took place on 6 May 2010 to elect members of Hull City Council in England. One third of the council was up for election and Liberal Democrats retained control of the council.

After the election, the composition of the council was:

- Liberal Democrat 33
- Labour 22
- Conservative 2
- Independent 2

== Ward results ==
No elections were held in Beverley, Kings Park and Newland wards.

=== Avenue ===
Avenue
Party	Candidate	Votes	%	±%
Liberal Democrats	Simone Butterworth	2,793	49.6	
Labour	Andrew Michael Deane	1,661	29.5	
Green	Martin John Deane	673	11.9	
Conservative	Alexander David Hayward	509	9.0	
Majority		1,132	20.0	
Turnout		5,665	60.1	
Liberal Democrats hold		Swing		

=== Boothferry ===
Boothferry
Party	Candidate	Votes	%	±%
Liberal Democrats	Stephen Baker	2,202	40.4	
Labour	John Alfred Bailey	1,811	33.2	
Conservative	Daniel Joseph Frazer	771	14.1	
UKIP	Brian Shepherd	428	7.8	
English Democrat	David Rust	245	4.5	
Majority		391	7.1	
Turnout		5,480	57.4	
Liberal Democrats hold		Swing		

=== Bransholme East ===
Bransholme East
Party	Candidate	Votes	%	±%
Independent	Anita Harrison	962	36.4	
Labour	Peter David Clark	930	35.2	
Liberal Democrats	Robyn Randall	466	17.6	
Conservative	Colin Robert Baxter	211	8.0	
Green	Lilly Lawton	72	2.7	
Majority		32	1.2	
Turnout		2,662	39.1	
Independent hold		Swing		

=== Bransholme West ===
Two candidates elected.

Bransholme West
Party	Candidate	Votes	%	±%
Labour	Phil Webster	1,251	26.6	
Labour	Helene O'Mullane	1,171	24.9	
Liberal Democrats	Aimi Sugarman	676	14.4	
Liberal Democrats	Charles Quinn	600	12.7	
Conservative	David Triffitt Whellan	614	13.0	
Green	Mark Gretton	243	5.2	
Independent	Anita Harrison	154	3.3	
Majority		80	1.7	
Turnout		2,662	44.9	
Labour hold		Swing		
Labour hold		Swing		

=== Bricknell ===
Two candidates elected.

Bricknell
Party	Candidate	Votes	%	±%
Conservative	John Logan Fareham	1,937	24.8	
Conservative	John Francis Abbott	1,671	21.4	
Liberal Democrats	Carla Ramsay	1,109	14.2	
Labour	Lynn Petrini	1,032	13.2	
Labour	Gwendoline Lunn	999	12.8	
Liberal Democrats	Brian Tompsett	800	10.2	
Green	James Edward Russell	261	3.3	
Majority		266	3.4	
Turnout		4,186	64.2	
Conservative hold		Swing		
Conservative hold		Swing		

=== Derringham ===
Derringham
Party	Candidate	Votes	%	±%
Liberal Democrats	Stephen Hull	2,079	42.2	
Labour	Gary Douglas Wareing	1,487	30.2	
Conservative	Craig William Ulliott	692	14.1	
UKIP	John Henry Cornforth	667	13.5	
Majority		592	12.0	
Turnout		4,939	55.3	
Liberal Democrats hold		Swing		

=== Drypool ===
Drypool
Party	Candidate	Votes	%	±%
Liberal Democrats	Linda Chambers	2,323	48.9	
Labour	Alan David Gardiner	1,695	35.7	
Conservative	David Thompson	503	10.6	
Green	Zoe Belinda Lloyd	228	4.8	
Majority		628	13.2	
Turnout		4,767	50.6	
Liberal Democrats hold		Swing		

=== Holderness ===
Holderness
Party	Candidate	Votes	%	±%
Liberal Democrats	Jan Hornby	2,560	43.4	
Labour	Pete Allen	2,389	40.5	
Conservative	Andrew John Barrett	949	16.1	
Majority		171	2.9	
Turnout		5,938	58.9	
Liberal Democrats hold		Swing		

=== Ings ===
Ings
Party	Candidate	Votes	%	±%
Labour	Steven Walker	2,211	41.5	
Liberal Democrats	Patrick Spicer	1,853	34.7	
Conservative	Philip David MacKay	689	12.9	
Independent	Mel Taylor	581	10.9	
Majority		358	6.8	
Turnout		5,362	56.5	
Labour gain from N.E.W. Hull Independent		Swing		

=== Longhill ===
Longhill
Party	Candidate	Votes	%	±%
Labour	Carol Ann Clarkson	2,235	55.2	
Liberal Democrats	Esther Moulson	639	15.8	
Conservative	Leslie Harry Fisher	480	11.8	
Independent	Chris Lefevre	272	6.7	
BNP	Jason Paul Carr	268	6.6	
English Democrat	Billy Hughes	158	3.9	
Majority		1,596	39.3	
Turnout		4,065	47.4	
Labour hold		Swing		

=== Marfleet ===
Marfleet
Party	Candidate	Votes	%	±%
Labour	Sean Chaytor	2,168	59.3	
Liberal Democrats	Julie Ann Hunt	674	18.5	
Conservative	Richard James Munslow	482	13.2	
National Front	Mike Cooper	329	9.0	
Majority		1,494	40.8	
Turnout		3,662	40.3	
Labour hold		Swing		

=== Myton ===
Myton
Party	Candidate	Votes	%	±%
Labour	Matrin Mancey	1,852	47.4	
Liberal Democrats	Peter Welton	812	20.8	
Conservative	Dan Bond	465	11.9	
UKIP	Kenneth William Hordon	283	7.2	
National Front	Nick Walsh	197	5.0	
Green	Susan Ivy Harr	165	4.2	
English Democrat	Rachel Louise Carter	137	3.5	
Majority		1,040	26.4	
Turnout		3,942	40.1	
Labour hold		Swing		

=== Newington ===
Newington
Party	Candidate	Votes	%	±%
Labour	Alan Clark	1,410	42.2	
Liberal Democrats	Damian Walker	1,319	39.4	
English Democrat	Tineke Shayne Robinson	317	9.5	
Conservative	Peter Lawrence Abraham	298	8.9	
Majority		91	2.7	
Turnout		3,358	41.5	
Labour gain from Liberal Democrats		Swing		

=== Orchard Park and Greenwood ===
Orchard Park and Greenwood
Party	Candidate	Votes	%	±%
Labour	Terry Geraghty	2,385	65.1	
Liberal Democrats	Chris Randall	973	26.6	
Conservative	Matthew Jones	306	8.4	
Majority		1,412	38.1	
Turnout		3,704	40.7	
Labour hold		Swing		

=== Pickering ===
Pickering
Party	Candidate	Votes	%	±%
Liberal Democrats	Abigail Bell	2,022	42.7	
Labour	Leanne Fudge	1,697	35.8	
Conservative	Matthew James Leonard	508	10.7	
BNP	Jonathan Patrick Mainprize	311	6.6	
English Democrat	Sharon Joan Mawer	199	4.2	
Majority		325	6.8	
Turnout		4,750	52.5	
Liberal Democrats hold		Swing		

=== Southcoates East ===
Southcoates East
Party	Candidate	Votes	%	±%
Labour	David William Gemmell	1,440	61.9	
Liberal Democrats	Mike Chambers	551	23.7	
Conservative	Andrew Neil Forster	336	14.4	
Majority		889	37.8	
Turnout		2,351	41.1	
Labour hold		Swing		

=== Southcoates West ===
Southcoates West
Party	Candidate	Votes	%	±%
Labour	Steve Brady	1,803	62.6	
Liberal Democrats	Dale Webster	462	16.0	
Conservative	John Crompton	315	10.9	
UKIP	Mike Hookem	302	10.5	
Majority		1,341	46.4	
Turnout		2,888	48.1	
Labour hold		Swing		

=== St Andrews ===
St Andrews
Party	Candidate	Votes	%	±%
Labour	Nadine Fudge	1,038	56.9	
Liberal Democrats	Tracey Irene Henry	316	17.3	
English Democrat	Peter Mawer	274	15.0	
Conservative	Bob Cook	197	10.8	
Majority		722	39.4	
Turnout		1,834	36.0	
Labour hold		Swing		

=== Sutton ===
Sutton
Party	Candidate	Votes	%	±%
Liberal Democrats	Terry Keal	2,347	44.9	
Labour	Dave Craker	2,212	42.3	
Conservative	Douglas Colin Percy	670	12.8	
Majority		135	2.6	
Turnout		5,274	54.7	
Liberal Democrats hold		Swing		

=== University ===
University
Party	Candidate	Votes	%	±%
Liberal Democrats	Tom McEvoy	1,603	47.4	
Labour Co-op	Joyce Irene Korczak Fields	1,315	38.9	
Conservative	Sheila Gladys Airey	463	13.7	
Majority		288	8.4	
Turnout		3,426	48.3	
Liberal Democrats hold		Swing		
