= 2003 Hull City Council election =

2003 UK local government election

Map of the results of the 2003 Hull council election. Labour in red, Liberal Democrats in yellow, Independent in grey, Uncontested in cream.

The 2003 Hull City Council election took place on 1 May 2003 to elect members of Hull City Council in England. One third of the council was up for election and the council stayed under no overall control.

The council had fallen from Labour control in the 2002 election after the Liberal Democrats made big gains. The 2003 election saw controversy over a proposal to demolish 2,500 council houses in Hull, which had seen some Liberal Democrat cabinet members sacked and other councillors leave the party. The results saw Labour make 4 gains to become the largest party on the council once again, which enabled them to form the administration on the council.

After the election, the composition of the council was

- Labour 28
- Liberal Democrat 21
- Independent 8
- Conservative 2

== Election result ==
Hull local election result 2003
Party	Seats	Gains	Losses	Net gain/loss	Seats %	Votes %	Votes	+/−
Labour	10	4	0	+4	52.6	44.8	16,570	+5.7%
Liberal Democrats	7	0	3	-3	36.8	37.3	13,823	-8.8%
Independent	2	0	1	-1	10.5	7.2	2,658	+0.9%
Conservative	0	0	0	0	0	7.2	2,661	+0.1%
Green	0	0	0	0	0	1.4	507	+0.7%
BNP	0	0	0	0	0	0.9	330	+0.9%
UKIP	0	0	0	0	0	0.7	271	+0.4%
Socialist Alliance	0	0	0	0	0	0.5	167	+0.4%
Legalise Cannabis	0	0	0	0	0	0.1	39	+0.1%

== Ward results ==
Avenue
Party	Candidate	Votes	%	±%
Liberal Democrats	David Woods	1,449	57.9	
Labour	Harold Neilson	708	28.3	
Green	Louise Muston	180	7.2	
Socialist Alliance	Geoffrey Collier	167	6.7	
Majority		741	29.6	
Turnout		2,504		
Liberal Democrats hold		Swing		

Beverley
Party	Candidate	Votes	%	±%
Liberal Democrats	David McCobb	1,386	61.1	
Labour	John Shields	542	23.9	
Conservative	Andrew Forster	339	15.0	
Majority		844	37.2	
Turnout		2,267		
Liberal Democrats hold		Swing		

Boothferry
Party	Candidate	Votes	%	±%
Liberal Democrats	Karen Woods	1,086	44.5	
Labour	Michael Whiting	971	39.8	
Conservative	John Sharp	383	15.7	
Majority		115	4.7	
Turnout		2,440		
Liberal Democrats hold		Swing		

Bransholme East
Party	Candidate	Votes	%	±%
Independent	Nadene Burton	538	40.3	
Labour	John Webster	445	33.3	
Liberal Democrats	Dereck Hardman	274	20.5	
BNP	Alan Siddle	77	5.8	
Majority		93	7.0	
Turnout		1,334		
Independent hold		Swing		

Bransholme West
Party	Candidate	Votes	%	±%
Labour	Gordon Wilson	823	69.2	+7.2
Liberal Democrats	Karen Mathieson	162	13.6	−15.6
BNP	Richard Brown	119	10.0	+10.0
Independent	Robert Harrison	86	7.2	+7.2
Majority		661	55.6	+22.8
Turnout		1,190		
Labour hold		Swing		

Derringham
Party	Candidate	Votes	%	±%
Independent	Clare Page	720	35.5	
Labour	Brian Wadforth	663	32.7	
UKIP	John Cornforth	271	13.4	
Liberal Democrats	Garry Oglesby	194	9.6	
Conservative	Robert Cook	181	8.9	
Majority		57	2.8	
Turnout		2,029		
Independent hold		Swing		

Drypool
Party	Candidate	Votes	%	±%
Labour	Gary Wareing	1,312	53.2	
Liberal Democrats	Maureen Obridge	996	40.4	
Conservative	Alan Winzor	158	6.4	
Majority		316	12.8	
Turnout		2,466		
Labour gain from Liberal Democrats		Swing		

Holderness
Party	Candidate	Votes	%	±%
Liberal Democrats	Yvonne Uzzell	1,131	45.2	
Labour	Rilba Jones	1,105	44.2	
Conservative	Albert Greendale	266	10.6	
Majority		26	1.0	
Turnout		2,502		
Liberal Democrats hold		Swing		

Ings
Party	Candidate	Votes	%	±%
Labour	Philip Webster	1,486	51.7	
Liberal Democrats	Frederick Healand	1,164	40.5	
Conservative	Andrew Hanson	226	7.9	
Majority		322	11.2	
Turnout		2,876		
Labour hold		Swing		

Kings Park
Party	Candidate	Votes	%	±%
Liberal Democrats	Carl Minns	716	55.6	
Labour	Daniel Brown	363	28.2	
Independent	Katharina Hancock	152	11.8	
Conservative	Sheila Airey	56	4.4	
Majority		353	27.2	
Turnout		1,287		
Liberal Democrats hold		Swing		

Longhill
Party	Candidate	Votes	%	±%
Labour	John Black	1,221	63.8	
Liberal Democrats	Arthur Walker	395	20.6	
Conservative	Robert Brown	188	9.8	
Green	Raymond Atkin	110	5.7	
Majority		826	43.2	
Turnout		1,914		
Labour hold		Swing		

Marfleet
Party	Candidate	Votes	%	±%
Labour	Brenda Petch	1,335	75.3	
Liberal Democrats	Martin Uzzell	438	24.7	
Majority		897	50.6	
Turnout		1,773		
Labour hold		Swing		

Myton
Party	Candidate	Votes	%	±%
Labour	Colin Inglis	1,154	57.2	
Liberal Democrats	Miriam Benson	489	24.3	
Conservative	Richard McConnell	150	7.4	
Independent	Malcolm Fields	130	6.4	
Green	Peter Grayley	93	4.6	
Majority		665	32.9	
Turnout		2,016		
Labour hold		Swing		

Newington
Party	Candidate	Votes	%	±%
Labour	Kathryn Lavery	650	53.1	
Liberal Democrats	David Harris	457	37.4	
Conservative	David Thompson	116	9.5	
Majority		193	15.7	
Turnout		1,223		
Labour hold		Swing		

Newland
Party	Candidate	Votes	%	±%
Liberal Democrats	Mark Collinson	587	44.6	
Labour	Rodney Evans	506	38.5	
Conservative	Basil Bulmer	106	8.1	
Green	James Russell	77	5.9	
Legalise Cannabis	Carl Wagner	39	3.0	
Majority		81	6.1	
Turnout		1,315		
Liberal Democrats hold		Swing		

Orchard Park and Greenwood
Party	Candidate	Votes	%	±%
Labour	Trevor Larsen	1,095	52.0	
Independent	Tony Fee	387	18.4	
Independent	Louis Barron	358	17.0	
BNP	David Hannam	134	6.4	
Liberal Democrats	Adam Williams	132	6.3	
Majority		708	33.6	
Turnout		2,106		
Labour hold		Swing		

Pickering
Party	Candidate	Votes	%	±%
Labour	Julie Lowery	1,045	45.5	
Liberal Democrats	Ann Godden	790	34.4	
Independent	Peter Mawer	239	10.4	
Conservative	Reginald Britton	173	7.5	
Independent	Glenn Dickinson	48	2.1	
Majority		255	11.1	
Turnout		2,295		
Labour gain from Liberal Democrats		Swing		

Sutton
Party	Candidate	Votes	%	±%
Labour	Kenneth Turner	1,146	46.1	
Liberal Democrats	Kalvin Neal	1,145	46.1	
Conservative	Colin Baxter	194	7.8	
Majority		1	0.04	
Turnout		2,485		
Labour gain from Liberal Democrats		Swing		

University
Party	Candidate	Votes	%	±%
Liberal Democrats	Christine Randall	832	47.7	
Labour	John Nicholson	741	42.4	
Conservative	David Whellan	125	7.2	
Green	Gertrude Garton	47	2.7	
Majority		81	5.3	
Turnout		1,745		
Liberal Democrats hold		Swing		

No elections were held in Bricknell, Southcoates East, Southcoates West and St Andrews wards.
