= 2000 Hull City Council election =

2000 UK local government election

The 2000 Hull City Council election took place on 4 May 2000 to elect members of Hull City Council in England. One third of the council was up for election and the Labour Party kept overall control of the council.

For the election the period in which voters were able to vote was extended to 3 days from the normal one day in an effort to increase turnout.

After the election, the composition of the council was:

- Labour 44
- Liberal Democrat 10
- Independent 4
- Conservative 2

== Election result ==
Hull local election result 2000
Party	Seats	Gains	Losses	Net gain/loss	Seats %	Votes %	Votes	+/−
Labour	13			-6	61.9			
Liberal Democrats	6			+5	28.6			
Conservative	1			+1	4.8			
Independent	1			0	4.8			
