= 1999 Hull City Council election =

1999 UK local government election

The 1999 Hull City Council election took place on 6 May 1999 to elect members of Hull City Council in England. One third of the council was up for election and the Labour Party kept overall control of the council. Overall turnout in the election was 19.4%.

The election saw the National Executive Committee of the Labour Party monitor the selection of candidates for the party after the infighting that had been taking place locally.

After the election, the composition of the council was:

- Labour 50
- Liberal Democrat 5
- Independent 4
- Conservative 1

== Election result ==
Hull local election result 1999
Party	Seats	Gains	Losses	Net gain/loss	Seats %	Votes %	Votes	+/−
Labour	18			n/c	90	56.8		+5.5%
Liberal Democrats	2			+1	10	20.0		-6.6%
Conservative	0			0	0	14.8		-0.6%
Independent	0			-1	0			
