= 2023 Hull City Council election =

2023 English local election

- 4 May 2023

20 of 57 seats to Hull City Council 29 seats needed for a majority

	First party	Second party	Third party
Leader	Mike Ross	Daren Hale
Party	Liberal Democrats	Labour	Non-aligned
Seats before	29	27	1
Seats after	32	25	0
Seat change	▲3	▼2	▼1
Popular vote	17,855	14,880	N/A
Percentage	49.2%	41.0%	N/A
- 2023 Hull City Council Election Map
Leader before election
Mike Ross
Liberal Democrats
Leader after election
Mike Ross
Liberal Democrats

Map of the results of the 2023 Hull council election. Labour in red, Liberal Democrats in yellow, Uncontested in cream. Note that 2 seats were contested in Central Ward.

The 2023 Hull City Council election took place on 4 May 2023 to elect members of Hull City Council. This was on the same day as other local elections in England.

Hull has a mixture of two and three member wards and elections take place by thirds. This year 19 of the 21 wards held elections.

The Liberal Democrats retained control of the council with an increased majority after gaining two seats from the opposition Labour Party.

== Results summary ==
2023 Hull City Council election
Party	This election				Full council			This election		
Party	Candidates	Seats	Net	Seats %	Other	Total	Total %	Votes	Votes %	+/−
Liberal Democrats	{{{candidates}}}	11	▲2	55.0	21	32	56.1	17,855	49.2	+4.9
Labour	{{{candidates}}}	9	▼2	45.0	16	25	43.9	14,880	41.0	+0.5
Conservative	{{{candidates}}}	0	Steady	0.0	0	0	0.0	2,156	5.9	-5.7
Green	{{{candidates}}}	0	Steady	0.0	0	0	0.0	844	2.3	+0.1
TUSC	{{{candidates}}}	0	Steady	0.0	0	0	0.0	368	1.0	-0.1
Reform	{{{candidates}}}	0	Steady	0.0	0	0	0.0	157	0.4	+0.4

== Ward results ==
Hull City Council election results.

An asterisk * indicates an incumbent who stood for re-election.

Turnout figures where stated are the number of ballot papers handed out in a ward including any rejected ballot papers.

No elections took place in the Bricknell and University wards.

=== Avenue ===
Avenue
Party	Candidate	Votes	%	±%
Labour	Abhimanyu Singh*	1,662	51.0	+3.0
Liberal Democrats	Scott Preston	1,174	36.0	−5.4
Green	James Russell	330	10.1	+2.5
Conservative	Alex Hayward	94	2.9	0.0
Majority		488	15.0	+8.4
Turnout		3,287	37.1	−4.0
Labour hold		Swing	+4.2	

=== Beverley and Newland ===
Beverley and Newland
Party	Candidate	Votes	%	±%
Liberal Democrats	Paul Drake-Davis*	1,979	67.3	−1.7
Labour Co-op	Sian Alexander	755	25.7	+6.9
Conservative	Archie Bartlett	116	4.0	−2.1
TUSC	Phil Culshaw	90	3.1	New
Majority		1,224	41.6	−8.6
Turnout		2,954	31.0	+0.8
Liberal Democrats hold		Swing	-4.3	

=== Boothferry ===
Boothferry
Party	Candidate	Votes	%	±%
Liberal Democrats	Jack Haines*	1,324	58.5	−0.9
Labour	James Ireland	749	33.1	+3.4
Conservative	John Sharp	190	8.4	−2.5
Majority		575	25.4	−4.3
Turnout		2,282	25.8	−0.6
Liberal Democrats hold		Swing	-2.1	

=== Central ===
On 23 March 2023, Labour councillor Aneesa Akbar resigned as a councillor for the Central Ward, triggering a by-election that took place on the same day as the UK local elections.

Central
Party	Candidate	Votes	%	±%
Labour	Shane McMurray*	714	61.1	−2.5
Labour	Sharon Qassim	620	53.0	−10.6
Liberal Democrats	Motokin Ali	310	26.5	+4.8
Liberal Democrats	Lilyth Coglan	258	22.1	+0.4
Conservative	John Rymer	88	7.5	−7.3
Conservative	James Sargeant	87	7.4	−7.4
TUSC	Paul Spooner	79	6.7	NEW
Majority		N/A	N/A	N/A
Turnout		1,183	18.9	+1.6
Labour hold				
Labour hold				

=== Derringham ===
Derringham
Party	Candidate	Votes	%	±%
Liberal Democrats	Sarita Robinson	1,147	54.4	−3.1
Labour Co-op	George Grozav	816	38.7	+4.8
Conservative	Michael Whitehead	144	6.8	−1.8
Majority		331	15.7	−7.9
Turnout		2,127	23.9	+0.3
Liberal Democrats hold		Swing	-3.9	

=== Drypool ===
Drypool
Party	Candidate	Votes	%	±%
Liberal Democrats	Diana Hatcher*	1,545	67.5	+1.2
Labour	Musa Dogan	470	20.5	−2.0
Conservative	Stephen Hackett	116	5.1	−0.5
Green	John Allison-Walsh	109	4.8	+1.00
TUSC	Matthew Whale	49	2.1	+0.3
Majority		1,075	47.0	+3.2
Turnout		2,295	26.3	−2.2
Liberal Democrats hold		Swing	+1.6	

=== Holderness ===
Holderness
Party	Candidate	Votes	%	±%
Liberal Democrats	Kalvin Neal*	1,519	65.8	−0.9
Labour	Katherine Thompson	680	29.4	+2.3
Conservative	Stephen Brown	111	4.8	−1.4
Majority		839	36.4	−3.2
Turnout		2,321	26.6	−1.8
Liberal Democrats hold		Swing	-1.6	

=== Ings ===
Ings
Party	Candidate	Votes	%	±%
Labour	Denise Thompson*	740	46.9	−0.1
Liberal Democrats	Mark Collinson	642	40.7	+28.2
Conservative	Simon Trow	92	5.8	−20.4
Green	Gordon Bradshaw	83	5.3	−8.9
TUSC	Mike Hirst	22	1.4	New
Majority		98	6.2	−14.6
Turnout		1,583	22.5	−1.5
Labour hold		Swing	-14.1	

=== Kingswood ===
Kingswood
Party	Candidate	Votes	%	±%
Liberal Democrats	Charles Quinn*	939	74.1	+3.1
Labour	Nigel Filer	261	20.6	+7.6
Conservative	Corey Rigby	67	5.3	−9.9
Majority		678	53.5	−4.5
Turnout		1,272	19.2	−1.6
Liberal Democrats hold		Swing	-2.2	

=== Longhill and Bilton Grange ===
Longhill and Bilton Grange
Party	Candidate	Votes	%	±%
Liberal Democrats	Sherilee Jepmond	840	49.8	−6.6
Labour	Dean Kirk*	672	39.8	+5.6
Conservative	Les Fisher	99	5.9	−3.5
TUSC	Tony Smith	77	4.6	New
Majority		168	10.0	−12.2
Turnout		1,691	19.4	−2.9
Liberal Democrats gain from Labour		Swing	-6.1	

=== Marfleet ===
Marfleet
Party	Candidate	Votes	%	±%
Labour	Rosemary Pantelakis*	714	69.0	+14.5
Liberal Democrats	Karen Woods	225	21.8	+6.4
Conservative	Geoff Horton	95	9.2	−4.5
Majority		489	47.2	+8.1
Turnout		1,047	11.7	−1.8
Labour hold		Swing	+4.0	

=== Newington and Gipsyville ===
Newington and Gipsyville
Party	Candidate	Votes	%	±%
Labour	Gill Kennett*	885	58.7	+1.9
Liberal Democrats	Keith Smith	350	23.2	+3.1
Conservative	Daniel Bond	156	10.3	−4.1
Green	Andy Donegan	117	7.7	−1.0
Majority		535	35.5	−1.2
Turnout		1,525	15.0	−0.8
Labour hold		Swing	-0.6	

=== North Carr ===
North Carr
Party	Candidate	Votes	%	±%
Liberal Democrats	Garreth Byrne	825	54.6	+13.2
Labour	Jan Hornby	603	39.9	−9.3
Conservative	Graeme Wightman	83	5.5	−1.6
Majority		222	14.7	N/A
Turnout		1,518	15.4	−1.3
Liberal Democrats gain from Labour		Swing	+11.2	

=== Orchard Park ===
Orchard Park
Party	Candidate	Votes	%	±%
Labour	Gary Wareing*	883	48.6	−13.2
Liberal Democrats	Michael Gibbons	807	44.4	+20.7
Green	Kevin Paulson	67	3.7	New
Conservative	Farhana Khan	60	3.3	−11.2
Majority		76	4.2	−33.9
Turnout		1,833	18.4	+2.8
Labour hold		Swing	-16.9	

=== Pickering ===
Pickering
Party	Candidate	Votes	%	±%
Liberal Democrats	Mark Ieronimo*	1,102	57.8	+9.7
Labour	Terry Sullivan	731	38.4	−6.5
Conservative	Charles Dinsdale	73	3.8	−3.2
Majority		371	19.4	+16.2
Turnout		1,912	30.9	+1.2
Liberal Democrats hold		Swing	+8.1	

=== Southcoates ===
Southcoates
Party	Candidate	Votes	%	±%
Labour	Jessica Raspin	1,081	65.3	+4.3
Liberal Democrats	Lucy Thomas	278	16.8	−4.6
Reform	Ian Broadbent	157	9.5	New
Conservative	Catherine MacIntyre	140	8.4	−9.2
Majority		803	48.5	+8.9
Turnout		1,665	16.8	−0.9
Labour hold		Swing	+4.4	

=== St Andrew's and Docklands ===
St Andrew's and Docklands
Party	Candidate	Votes	%	±%
Labour Co-op	Haroldo Herrera-Richmond*	988	61.1	−2.9
Liberal Democrats	Callum Best	314	19.4	−2.9
Green	Raymond Barry	138	8.5	New
Conservative	Jack Devlin	127	7.8	−2.1
TUSC	James Bentley	51	3.2	New
Majority		674	41.7	0.0
Turnout		1,631	16.5	−0.1
Labour hold		Swing	0.00	

=== Sutton ===
Sutton
Party	Candidate	Votes	%	±%
Liberal Democrats	Allen Healand*	1,595	60.9	+3.6
Labour	Paul Harper	875	33.4	+1.1
Conservative	Frankie Williams	150	5.7	−2.2
Majority		720	27.5	+2.5
Turnout		2,627	26.6	−2.5
Liberal Democrats hold		Swing	+1.2	

=== West Carr ===
West Carr
Party	Candidate	Votes	%	±%
Liberal Democrats	Christine Randall*	940	53.1	−2.5
Labour	Karen Wood	601	33.9	+6.2
Conservative	Colin Baxter	155	8.7	−2.4
TUSC	Joyce Marshall	79	4.3	−1.3
Majority		339	19.2	−8.7
Turnout		1,777	20.0	−1.7
Liberal Democrats hold		Swing	-4.3	

== By-elections ==
=== Bricknell ===
Bricknell by-election 21 September 2023
Party	Candidate	Votes	%	±%
Labour	Sharon Hofman	919	43.7	−9.1
Liberal Democrats	Lucy Lennon	647	30.8	+25.3
Conservative	John Fareham	418	19.9	−15.9
Green	Kevin Paulson	98	4.7	−1.2
Yorkshire	James Steel	19	0.9	New
Majority		272	12.8	N/A
Turnout		2,109	35.0	−1.7
Rejected ballots		8		
Registered electors		6,052		
Labour hold		Swing	▼17.2	

=== Avenue ===
The by-election was called following the resignation of Marjorie Brabazon who held one of the seats for Labour.

Avenue by-election 15 February 2024
Party	Candidate	Votes	%	±%
Liberal Democrats	Rhiannon Beeson	1,186	45.7	+9.7
Labour	Karen Wood	1,029	39.7	−11.3
Green	James Russell	198	7.6	−2.5
Independent	Michael Whale	139	5.3	New
Conservative	Alex Hayward	43	1.7	−1.2
Majority		157	6.0	N/A
Turnout		2,607	29.0	−8.1
Rejected ballots		12		
Registered electors		9,111		
Liberal Democrats gain from Labour		Swing	▲10.5	
