= 2014 Hull City Council election =

2014 UK local government election

Map of the results of the 2014 Hull council election. Labour in red, Liberal Democrats in yellow, Conservatives in blue, UK Independence in purple, Uncontested in cream.

The 2014 Hull City Council election took place on 22 May 2014 to elect members of Hull City Council in England. One third of the council was up for election and Labour retained control of the council.

A total of 46,205 people voted from a registered electorate of 167,336. Turnout was therefore 27.6%.

After the election, the composition of the council was

- Labour 39
- Liberal Democrat 15
- Conservative 2
- Independent 2
- UK Independence 1

== Ward results ==
No elections were held in Beverley, Kings Park and Newland wards.

=== Avenue ===
Avenue
Party	Candidate	Votes	%	±%
Labour	Majorie Brabazon	1,303		
Liberal Democrats	Simone Butterworth	1,152		
Green	Martin Deane	771		
Conservative	Alexander Hayward	211		
Majority		151		
Rejected ballots		39		
Turnout		3,476	35.4	
Registered electors		9,818		
Labour gain from Liberal Democrats		Swing		

=== Boothferry ===
Boothferry
Party	Candidate	Votes	%	±%
Liberal Democrats	Ruth Payne	1,150		
UKIP	Paul Salvidge	809		
Labour	Philip Pocknee	807		
Conservative	Daniel Bond	154		
Majority		341		
Rejected ballots		14		
Turnout		2,934	30.5	
Registered electors		9,610		
Liberal Democrats hold		Swing		

=== Bransholme East ===
Bransholme East
Party	Candidate	Votes	%	±%
Labour	Anita Harrison	1,033		
Liberal Democrats	Eleanor Wood	119		
Conservative	Colin Baxter	111		
Majority		914		
Rejected ballots		30		
Turnout		1,293	18.0	
Registered electors		7,110		
Labour hold		Swing		

=== Bransholme West ===
Bransholme West
Party	Candidate	Votes	%	±%
Labour	Philip Webster	596		
UKIP	Colin Worrall	550		
Liberal Democrats	David Wood	57		
Conservative	Eden Barnes	48		
Majority		46		
Rejected ballots		6		
Turnout		1,257	20.0	
Registered electors		6,137		
Labour hold		Swing		

=== Bricknell ===
Bricknell
Party	Candidate	Votes	%	±%
Conservative	John Fareham	1,161		
Labour	Karen Rouse-Deane	669		
UKIP	Malcolm Johnson	377		
Green	James Russell	159		
Liberal Democrats	Sarita Robinson	70		
Majority		492		
Rejected ballots		7		
Turnout		2,443	37.4	
Registered electors		6,525		
Conservative hold		Swing		

=== Derringham ===
Derringham
Party	Candidate	Votes	%	±%
Liberal Democrats	Cheryl Payne	967		
UKIP	Robert Shepherd	731		
Labour	Gwendoline Lunn	696		
Conservative	Eleonor Whirehead	140		
Majority		236		
Rejected ballots		12		
Turnout		2,546	28.2	
Registered electors		9,004		
Liberal Democrats hold		Swing		

=== Drypool ===
Drypool
Party	Candidate	Votes	%	±%
Liberal Democrats	Linda Chambers	1,488		
Labour	Jannette Hornby	802		
UKIP	John Paterson	714		
Conservative	Salman Anwar	82		
Majority		686		
Rejected ballots		21		
Turnout		3,107	32.0	
Registered electors		9,702		
Liberal Democrats hold		Swing		

=== Holderness ===
Holderness
Party	Candidate	Votes	%	±%
Liberal Democrats	Jacqueline Dad	1,493		
UKIP	Surjit Singh	884		
Labour	Denise Thompson	846		
Conservative	John Crompton	113		
TUSC	Paul Spooner	67		
Majority		609		
Rejected ballots		7		
Turnout		3,410	33.4	
Registered electors		10,185		
Liberal Democrats hold		Swing		

=== Ings ===
Ings
Party	Candidate	Votes	%	±%
Labour	Michael Thompson	1,267		
UKIP	Adam Phillips	940		
Conservative	Philip MacKay	236		
Liberal Democrats	John Robinson	202		
Majority		327		
Rejected ballots		10		
Turnout		2,655	28.0	
Registered electors		9,448		
Labour hold		Swing		

=== Longhill ===
Longhill
Party	Candidate	Votes	%	±%
Labour	Carol Clarkson	1,076		
UKIP	Sophie Fairburn	747		
Conservative	Leslie Fisher	120		
Liberal Democrats	Elaine Keal	89		
Majority		329		
Rejected ballots		1		
Turnout		2,033	23.0	
Registered electors		8,741		
Labour hold		Swing		

=== Marfleet ===
Two vacancies to be filled, as a casual vacancy, created by the death of Councillor Waudby, was also to be filled.

Marfleet
Party	Candidate	Votes	%	±%
Labour	Sean Chaytor	1,229		
Labour	Sharon Belcher	1,172		
UKIP	Julian Penna	640		
Conservative	Jake Morrison	121		
Conservative	James Galer	108		
Liberal Democrats	Margaret Tompsett	105		
Liberal Democrats	Brian Tompsett	94		
Majority		57		
Rejected ballots		7		
Turnout		3,476	20.9	
Registered electors		9,404		
Labour hold		Swing		
Labour hold		Swing		

=== Myton ===
Myton
Party	Candidate	Votes	%	±%
Labour	Martin Mancey	1,020		
UKIP	Stanley Smith	740		
Liberal Democrats	Lee Fallin	193		
Green	Michael Lammiman	182		
Conservative	Joshua Myers	107		
Majority		280		
Rejected ballots		9		
Turnout		2,251	21.7	
Registered electors		10,270		
Labour hold		Swing		

=== Newington ===
Newington
Party	Candidate	Votes	%	±%
Labour	Alan Clark	839		
UKIP	Gillian Coupland	450		
Liberal Democrats	Steven Carter	224		
Conservative	Stephanie Bond	90		
Majority		389		
Rejected ballots		15		
Turnout		1,618	15.2	
Registered electors		8,198		
Labour hold		Swing		

=== Orchard Park & Greenwood ===
Orchard Park & Greenwood
Party	Candidate	Votes	%	±%
Labour	Terence Geraghty	1,097		
UKIP	Karl Hordon	833		
Liberal Democrats	Christine Randall	132		
Green	Carole Needham	55		
Conservative	Dehenna Davison	9		
Majority		264		
Rejected ballots		4		
Turnout		2,130	22.7	
Registered electors		9,400		
Labour hold		Swing		

=== Pickering ===
Pickering
Party	Candidate	Votes	%	±%
Liberal Democrats	Abi Bell	1,321		
Labour	Malcolm Fields	766		
UKIP	Peter Mawer	631		
Conservative	Naomi Fuller	75		
Majority		555		
Rejected ballots		11		
Turnout		2,804	30.9	
Registered electors		9,101		
Liberal Democrats hold		Swing		

=== Southcoates East ===
Southcoates East
Party	Candidate	Votes	%	±%
UKIP	Richard Barrett	638		
Labour	David Gemmell	629		
Conservative	Samuel Beckton	65		
Liberal Democrats	Allen Healand	53		
Majority		9		
Rejected ballots		4		
Turnout		1,389	23.3	
Registered electors		5,961		
UKIP gain from Labour		Swing		

=== Southcoates West ===
Southcoates West
Party	Candidate	Votes	%	±%
Labour	Stephen Brady	868		
UKIP	Mike Hookem	446		
Conservative	Oliver Harris	67		
Liberal Democrats	Michael Chambers	54		
TUSC	Peter March	30		
Majority		422		
Rejected ballots		3		
Turnout		1,468	24.8	
Registered electors		5,929		
Labour hold		Swing		

=== St Andrews ===
St Andrews
Party	Candidate	Votes	%	±%
Labour	Nadine Fudge	608		
UKIP	Kenneth Fairburn	347		
Independent	Simon Kelsey	150		
Liberal Democrats	Tracey Henry	114		
Conservative	Robert Cook	40		
Majority		261		
Rejected ballots		3		
Turnout		1,262	21.6	
Registered electors		5,850		
Labour hold		Swing		

=== Sutton ===
Sutton
Party	Candidate	Votes	%	±%
Liberal Democrats	Terence Keal	1,092		
Labour	Theresa Vaughan	924		
UKIP	John Morfitt	716		
Conservative	Christopher Oakley	134		
Majority		168		
Rejected ballots		13		
Turnout		2,879	29.9	
Registered electors		9,610		
Liberal Democrats hold		Swing		

=== University ===
University
Party	Candidate	Votes	%	±%
Labour	Steven Wilson	702		
UKIP	Victoria Butler	611		
Liberal Democrats	Chris Randall	221		
Green	Richard Howarth	120		
Conservative	Leon French	117		
Majority		91		
Rejected ballots		3		
Turnout		1,774	24.6	
Registered electors		7,255		
Labour gain from Liberal Democrats		Swing		
