= 2016 Hull City Council election =

2016 UK local government election

2016 local election results in Hull

The 2016 Hull City Council election took place on 5 May 2016 to elect members of Hull City Council in England. This was on the same day as other nationwide local elections. One third of the council was up for election with Labour defending overall control of the council. The Green Party did not field any candidates after the local party failed to submit nomination papers in time.

This result had the following consequences for the total number of seats on the Council after the elections:

Party	Previous council	New council	+/-
Labour	40	39	–1
Liberal Democrats	15	17	+2
Conservatives	2	2	Steady
UKIP	1	1	Steady
Independent	1	0	–1
Total	59	59	
Working majority	21	19	

== Ward results ==
No elections were held in Bransholme East, Bransholme West and University wards.

=== Avenue ===
Avenue
Party	Candidate	Votes	%	±%
Liberal Democrats	John Robinson	1,852	50.0	+30.1
Labour	Rosie Nicola	1,537	41.5	+1.8
UKIP	Dave Rutter	224	6.0	−3.7
Conservative	Alexander Hayward	93	2.5	−6.2
Majority		315	8.5	
Turnout		3,706	40.9	
Liberal Democrats gain from Labour		Swing		

=== Beverley ===
Beverley
Party	Candidate	Votes	%	±%
Liberal Democrats	Karen Mathieson	1,628	67.4	
Labour	Matthew Kay	485	20.1	
UKIP	Danny Ross	239	9.9	
Conservative	Lars Kascha	64	2.6	
Majority		1,143	47.3	
Turnout		2,416	37.7	
Liberal Democrats hold		Swing		

=== Boothferry ===
Boothferry
Party	Candidate	Votes	%	±%
Liberal Democrats	Maria Coward	1,385		
Labour	Paula Baxter	800		
UKIP	Bill Palfreman	529		
Conservative	Daniel Bond	146		
Majority		585		
Liberal Democrats hold		Swing		

=== Bricknell ===
Bricknell
Party	Candidate	Votes	%	±%
Conservative	John Abbott	967		
Labour	Shane McMurray	960		
UKIP	Phil Fussey	271		
Liberal Democrats	Sarita Robinson	117		
National Front	Nick Walsh	7		
Majority		7		
Conservative hold		Swing		

=== Derringham ===
Derringham
Party	Candidate	Votes	%	±%
Liberal Democrats	Ryan Langley	967		
Labour	Simon Pickering	742		
UKIP	James Chapman	568		
Conservative	Andrew Forster	106		
Majority		225		
Liberal Democrats hold		Swing		

=== Drypool ===
Drypool
Party	Candidate	Votes	%	±%
Liberal Democrats	Adam Williams	1,718		
Labour	Steven Graham	770		
UKIP	Ben Fuller	410		
Conservative	Joshua McMullan	77		
SDP	Val Hoodless	30		
Majority		948		
Liberal Democrats hold		Swing		

=== Holderness ===
Holderness
Party	Candidate	Votes	%	±%
Liberal Democrats	Linda Tock	1,461		
Labour	Deborah Matthews	929		
UKIP	Sergi Singh	677		
Conservative	Jonathan Downs	71		
Majority		532		
Liberal Democrats gain from Labour		Swing		

=== Ings ===
Ings
Party	Candidate	Votes	%	±%
Labour	Denise Thompson	1,336		
UKIP	Rob Hudson	565		
Liberal Democrats	Allen Healand	279		
Conservative	Matthew Shotton	185		
Majority		771		
Labour hold		Swing		

=== Kings Park ===
Kings Park
Party	Candidate	Votes	%	±%
Liberal Democrats	Charles Quinn	1,402		
Labour	Theresa Vaughan	576		
UKIP	Glenn Brown	270		
Conservative	Dehenna Davison	133		
Majority		826		
Liberal Democrats hold		Swing		

=== Longhill ===
Longhill
Party	Candidate	Votes	%	±%
Labour	John Hewitt	1,007		
UKIP	Sophie Fairburn	431		
Conservative	Les Fisher	120		
Liberal Democrats	Will Fielding	109		
Majority		576		
Labour hold		Swing		

=== Marfleet ===
Marfleet
Party	Candidate	Votes	%	±%
Labour	Sharon Belcher	993		
UKIP	Jason Shillito	420		
Conservative	Richard Munslow	95		
Liberal Democrats	Mike Chambers	92		
Majority		573		
Labour hold		Swing		

=== Myton ===
Myton
Party	Candidate	Votes	%	±%
Labour	Colin Inglis	1,005		
Liberal Democrats	Motokin Ali	204		
UKIP	Paul Adams	132		
TUSC	Paul Spooner	127		
Conservative	Jack Davis	125		
Majority		801		
Labour hold		Swing		

=== Newington ===
Newington
Party	Candidate	Votes	%	±%
Labour	Helena Spencer	792		
UKIP	John Kitchener	375		
Liberal Democrats	Steve Carter	204		
Conservative	Stephanie Bond	132		
Majority		417		
Labour hold		Swing		

=== Newland ===
Newland
Party	Candidate	Votes	%	±%
Liberal Democrats	Mike Ross	922		
Labour	Phil Pocknee	613		
UKIP	Chris d'Andilly	140		
Conservative	Lewis Worrow	22		
Majority		309		
Liberal Democrats hold		Swing		

=== Orchard Park and Greenwood ===
Orchard Park and Greenwood
Party	Candidate	Votes	%	±%
Labour	Steven Bayes	968		
UKIP	Paul Barlow	396		
Liberal Democrats	Dominic Anderson	129		
Conservative	Charlie Prothero	64		
Majority		572		
Labour hold		Swing		

=== Pickering ===
Pickering
Party	Candidate	Votes	%	±%
Liberal Democrats	Claire Thomas*	1,618		
Labour	Matt Redmore	627		
UKIP	Macauley Chapman	275		
Conservative	Jay Honeywood	58		
Majority		991		
Liberal Democrats hold		Swing		

=== Southcoates East ===
Southcoates East
Party	Candidate	Votes	%	±%
Labour	Helster Bridges	673		
UKIP	David Bond	365		
Liberal Democrats	Maggie Tompsett	50		
Conservative	Colin Baxter	47		
Majority		308		
Labour hold		Swing		

=== Southcoates West ===
Southcoates West
Party	Candidate	Votes	%	±%
Labour	Mary Glew*	851		
UKIP	Mark Fox	408		
Conservative	William Sharpe	62		
Liberal Democrats	Brian Tompsett	54		
Majority		443		
Labour hold		Swing		

=== St Andrews ===
St Andrews
Party	Candidate	Votes	%	±%
Labour	Daren Hale*	641		
UKIP	Ken Fairburn	250		
Liberal Democrats	Tracey Henry	63		
Conservative	Bob Cook	53		
Majority		391		
Labour hold		Swing		

=== Sutton ===
Sutton
Party	Candidate	Votes	%	±%
Labour	Ken Turner*	1,154		
Liberal Democrats	Elaine Keal	662		
UKIP	Anthony Mount	414		
Conservative	Grant Clark	146		
Majority		492		
Labour hold		Swing		
