= 2022 Hull City Council election =

2022 UK local government election

- 5 May 2022

19 of 57 seats to Hull City Council 29 seats needed for a majority

	First party	Second party	Third party
Leader	Mike Ross	Daren Hale
Party	Liberal Democrats	Labour	Non-aligned
Seats before	26	29
Seats after	29	27	1
Seat change	▼3	▼2	▲1
	Fourth party
Leader	John Fareham
Party	Conservative
Seats before	1
Seats after	0
Seat change	▼1
Leader before election
Daren Hale
Labour
Leader after election
Mike Ross
Liberal Democrats

Map of the results of the 2022 Hull council election. Labour in red, Liberal Democrats in yellow, Uncontested in cream.

The 2022 Hull City Council election took place on 5 May 2022 to elect members of Hull City Council. This was on the same day as other local elections.

Following a review of Ward boundaries by the Local Government Boundary Commission for England (LGBCE) the whole council was elected in 2018, the first placed winning candidate at that election was up for re-election in 2022. The Labour Party was defending overall control of the council by a single seat after Labour councillor Julia Conner defected to the Liberal Democrats, on 3 March 2022. There were no elections in Ings or Kingswood wards, being two member wards and not being on this round of the three-year cycle.

The Liberal Democrats won control of the council, ending 10 years of Labour administration.

== Council results ==
Party	Councillors				Votes		
Party		Of total	Net			Of total	Net
Liberal Democrats	10	52.6%	+3	10 / 19	17,949	44.3%	+4.4%
Labour	9	47.4%	-2	9 / 19	16,416	40.5%	+5.0%
Conservative	0	0.0%	-1	0 / 19	4,707	11.6%	-6.8%
Green	0	0.0%	0	0 / 19	900	2.2%	-2.1%
Independent	0	0.0%	0	0 / 19	271	0.7%	-0.9%
TUSC	0	0.0%	0	0 / 19	194	0.5%	-0.3%
For Britain	0	0.0%	0	0 / 19	65	0.2%	-0.1%

== Ward results ==
Swings are as compared to 2021 while holds are compared to the last time the set of candidates sought re-election (i.e. 2018).

Turnout figures where stated are the number of ballot papers handed out in a ward including any rejected ballot papers.

=== Avenue ===
Avenue
Party	Candidate	Votes	%	±%
Labour	Marjorie Brabazon	1,764	48.04	13.47
Liberal Democrats	Craig Woolmer	1,520	41.39	−5.49
Green	James Russell	280	7.63	−2.08
Conservative	Alexander Hayward	108	2.94	−2.10
Majority		244	6.64	18.96
Turnout		-	41.09	1.04
Rejected ballots		–		
Registered electors		–		
Labour hold		Swing	+9.48	

=== Beverley and Newland ===
Beverley and Newland
Party	Candidate	Votes	%	±%
Liberal Democrats	David McCobb	2,036	68.99	4.87
Labour	Jessica Raspin	554	18.77	−0.01
Green	Julia Brown	182	6.17	−1.08
Conservative	Lee Morgan	179	6.07	−3.78
Majority		-	-	−
Turnout		-	30.22	0.51
Rejected ballots				
Registered electors				
Liberal Democrats hold		Swing	2.44	

=== Boothferry ===
Boothferry
Party	Candidate	Votes	%	±%
Liberal Democrats	Maria Coward	1,415	59.35	8.07
Labour	Paul Harper	708	29.70	5.22
Conservative	James Sargeant	261	10.95	−7.39
Majority				
Turnout			26.35	−0.55
Rejected ballots				
Registered electors				
Liberal Democrats hold		Swing	+1.43	

=== Bricknell ===
Bricknell
Party	Candidate	Votes	%	±%
Labour	Sarah Harper	1,188	52.75	5.06
Conservative	John Fareham	806	35.79	−5.04
Green	Kevin Paulson	134	5.95	−1.21
Liberal Democrats	Sarita Robinson	124	5.51	1.19
Majority				
Turnout			36.77	−1.25
Rejected ballots				
Registered electors				
Labour gain from Conservative		Swing		

=== Central ===
Central
Party	Candidate	Votes	%	±%
Labour	Aneesa Akbar	702	63.59	−5.46
Liberal Democrats	Lee Fallin	239	21.65	−1.39
Conservative	Harry Noble	163	14.76	6.85
Majority				
Turnout			17.32	−2.7
Rejected ballots				
Registered electors				
Labour hold		Swing	-4.06	

There was no election in Central ward in 2021, so changes are shown from the 2019 election.

=== Derringham ===
Derringham
Party	Candidate	Votes	%	±%
Liberal Democrats	Cheryl Payne	1,223	57.50	12.49
Labour	Sarah Hicks	722	33.94	7.46
Conservative	Mike Whitehead	182	8.56	−10.71
Majority				
Turnout			23.61	+0.31
Rejected ballots				
Registered electors				
Liberal Democrats hold		Swing	+2.52	

=== Drypool ===
Drypool
Party	Candidate	Votes	%	±%
Liberal Democrats	Linda Chambers	1,681	66.29	3.94
Labour	David Craker	571	22.52	3.26
Conservative	Archie Bartlett	141	5.56	−5.85
Green	John Allison-Walsh	97	3.82	−0.29
TUSC	Tony Smith	46	1.81	New
Majority				
Turnout			28.45	−1.05
Rejected ballots				
Registered electors				
Liberal Democrats hold		Swing	+0.35	

=== Holderness ===
Holderness
Party	Candidate	Votes	%	±%
Liberal Democrats	Jackie Dad	1,671	66.71	12.49
Labour	Jan Hornby	679	27.11	0.80
Conservative	Corey Rigby	155	6.19	−8.93
Majority				
Turnout			28.42	−1.33
Rejected ballots				
Registered electors				
Liberal Democrats hold		Swing	+5.84	

=== Longhill and Bilton Grange ===
Longhill and Bilton Grange
Party	Candidate	Votes	%	±%
Liberal Democrats	Tim Kemp	1,113	56.41	
Labour	John Black	675	34.21	
Conservative	John Rymer	185	9.38	
Majority				
Turnout			22.29	
Rejected ballots				
Registered electors				
Liberal Democrats gain from Labour		Swing	+28.22	

=== Marfleet ===
Marfleet
Party	Candidate	Votes	%	±%
Labour	Patrick Wilkinson	657	54.48	3.49
Independent	Sean Chaytor	198	16.42	New
Liberal Democrats	Brian Gurevitch	186	15.42	6.19
Conservative	Geoff Horton	165	13.68	−8.94
Majority				
Turnout		13.45	1.17	
Rejected ballots				
Registered electors				
Labour gain from Independent		Swing	-6.46	

Sean Chaytor was elected as a Labour Councillor in 2018 but was removed by the party in 2022 and subsequently stood as an independent.

=== Newington and Gipsyville ===
Newington and Gipsyville
Party	Candidate	Votes	%	±%
Labour	Lynn Petrini	937	56.79	5.78
Liberal Democrats	Karen Woods	332	20.12	5.91
Conservative	Richard Royal	238	14.42	−10.07
Green	Andy Donegan	143	8.67	3.82
Majority				
Turnout			15.78	−1.38
Rejected ballots				
Registered electors				
Labour hold		Swing	-0.06	

=== North Carr ===
North Carr
Party	Candidate	Votes	%	±%
Labour	Anita Harrison	815	49.21	14.87
Liberal Democrats	Phil Newsom	686	41.43	−4.80
Conservative	Graeme Wightman	118	7.13	−9.89
TUSC	James Bentley	37	2.23	−0.18
Majority				
Turnout			16.69	+0.76
Rejected ballots				
Registered electors				
Labour hold		Swing	-9.82	

=== Orchard Park ===
Orchard Park
Party	Candidate	Votes	%	±%
Labour	Deborah Matthews	987	61.76	6.36
Liberal Democrats	Brian Tompsett	379	23.72	10.59
Conservative	Farhana Khan	232	14.52	−7.34
Majority				
Turnout			15.61	−0.96
Rejected ballots				
Registered electors				
Labour hold		Swing	-2.12	

=== Pickering ===
Pickering
Party	Candidate	Votes	%	±%
Liberal Democrats	Tracey Henry	910	48.07	−14.76
Labour	Terry Sullivan	850	44.90	14.55
Conservative	Oscar Harrison	133	7.03	0.20
Majority				
Turnout			29.69	+4.02
Rejected ballots				
Registered electors				
Liberal Democrats hold		Swing	-14.66	

There was no election in Pickering ward in 2021, so changes are shown from the 2019 election.

=== Southcoates ===
Southcoates
Party	Candidate	Votes	%	±%
Labour	Anna Marie Thompson	1,101	61.00	5.81
Liberal Democrats	Michael Chambers	387	21.44	5.83
Conservative	Ian Pearson	317	17.56	−11.64
Majority				
Turnout			17.73	−1.36
Rejected ballots				
Registered electors				
Labour hold		Swing	-0.01	

=== St Andrews and Docklands ===
St Andrews and Docklands
Party	Candidate	Votes	%	±%
Labour	Leanne Fudge	1,106	64.04	14.48
Liberal Democrats	George Norris	385	22.29	−7.92
Conservative	Curt Pugh	171	9.90	0.29
For Britain	Barry McGrath	65	3.76	1.76
Majority				
Turnout			16.59	−6.09
Rejected ballots				
Registered electors				
Labour hold		Swing	-11.2	

=== Sutton ===
Sutton
Party	Candidate	Votes	%	±%
Liberal Democrats	Terence Keal	1,676	57.32	5.25
Labour	Rob Dunstan	945	32.32	2.87
Conservative	Stephen Hackett	230	7.87	−6.15
Independent	Colin Worrall	73	2.50	1.41
Majority				
Turnout			29.11	−3.27
Rejected ballots				
Registered electors				
Liberal Democrats gain from Labour		Swing	+1.19	

=== University ===
University
Party	Candidate	Votes	%	±%
Liberal Democrats	Holly Burton	882	53.20	35.35
Labour	Gwen Lunn	604	36.43	−13.18
Conservative	Sam Barrick	108	6.51	−18.90
Green	Richard Howarth	64	3.86	−3.28
Majority				
Turnout			24.66	+4.71
Rejected ballots				
Registered electors				
Liberal Democrats gain from Labour		Swing	+24.27	

=== West Carr ===
West Carr
Party	Candidate	Votes	%	±%
Liberal Democrats	Rob Pritchard	1,104	55.59	2.48
Labour	Penny Rodmell	551	27.74	4.89
Conservative	Colin Baxter	220	11.08	−9.26
TUSC	Joyce Marshall	111	5.59	3.06
Majority				
Turnout			21.70	−2.09
Rejected ballots				
Registered electors				
Liberal Democrats hold		Swing	-1.2	
