= 2019 Hull City Council election =

2019 UK local government election

Map of the results of the 2019 Hull council election. Labour in red, Liberal Democrats in yellow, Uncontested in cream.

The 2019 Hull City Council election took place on 2 May 2019 to elect members of Hull City Council in England. This was on the same day as other nationwide local elections. Following a review of Ward boundaries by the Local Government Boundary Commission for England (LGBCE) the whole council was elected in 2018, the 3rd placed winning candidate at that election is up for re-election in 2019. The Labour Party were defending and successfully maintained their overall control of the council.

There were no elections in Bricknell or University wards, being two member wards and not being on this round of the three-year cycle.

This result had the following consequences for the total number of seats on the Council after the elections:

Party	Previous council	New council	+/-
Labour	31	31	Steady
Liberal Democrats	24	24	Steady
Conservatives	2	2	Steady
Total	57	57	
Working majority	5	5	

== Results summary ==
2019 Hull City Council election
Party	This election			Full council			This election		
Party	Seats	Net	Seats %	Other	Total	Total %	Votes	Votes %	+/−
Labour	10	Steady	52.6	21	31	54.4	14,873	40.1	
Liberal Democrats	9	Steady	47.4	15	24	42.1	15,968	43.0	
Conservative	0	Steady	0.0	2	2	3.5	2,781	7.5	
Green	0	Steady	0.0	0	0	0.0	2,131	5.7	
Independent	0	Steady	0.0	0	0	0.0	630	1.7	
UKIP	0	Steady	0.0	0	0	0.0	468	1.3	
For Britain	0	Steady	0.0	0	0	0.0	267	0.7	

== Ward results ==
An asterisk * indicates an incumbent who stood for re-election.

Turnout figures where stated are the number of ballot papers handed out in a ward including any rejected ballot papers.

=== Avenue ===
Avenue
Party	Candidate	Votes	%	±%
Labour	Abhimanyu Singh	1,630	43.25	
Liberal Democrats	John Robinson*	1,614	42.82	
Green	Mike Lammiman	411	10.90	
Conservative	Alexander Hayward	114	3.02	
Majority		16	0.43	
Turnout		3,815	41.36	
Labour gain from Liberal Democrats		Swing		

=== Beverley and Newland ===
Beverley and Newland
Party	Candidate	Votes	%	±%
Liberal Democrats	Paul Drake-Davis*	1,895	64.52	
Labour Co-op	Karen Wood	674	22.95	
Green	Debbie Newton	244	8.31	
Conservative	Joshua Cass	124	4.22	
Majority		1,221	41.57	
Turnout		3,003	30.66	
Liberal Democrats hold		Swing		

=== Boothferry ===
Boothferry
Party	Candidate	Votes	%	±%
Liberal Democrats	Jack Haines	1,287	52.40	
Labour	Amber Goodwin	701	28.54	
Independent	Ben Morgan	181	7.37	
Conservative	John Sharp	155	6.31	
Green	Luke Shaw	132	5.37	
Majority		586	23.86	
Turnout		2,494	26.87	
Liberal Democrats hold		Swing		

=== Central ===
Central
Party	Candidate	Votes	%	±%
Labour	Shane McMurray*	872	69.04	
Liberal Democrats	Jurgita Kirtikliene	291	23.04	
Conservative	Matthew Comber	100	7.92	
Majority		581	46.00	
Turnout		1,321	20.2	
Labour hold		Swing		

=== Derringham ===
Derringham
Party	Candidate	Votes	%	±%
Liberal Democrats	Ryan Langley*	1,049	51.75	
Labour Co-op	Leanne Fudge	518	25.56	
Independent	Derek French	202	9.97	
Green	Bryan Berue	135	6.66	
Conservative	Lucy Whitehead	123	6.07	
Majority		531	26.19	
Turnout		2,078	22.44	
Liberal Democrats hold		Swing		

=== Drypool ===
Drypool
Party	Candidate	Votes	%	±%
Liberal Democrats	Diana Hatcher*	1,740	68.86	
Labour	Tony Smith	489	19.19	
Green	John Allison-Walsh	186	7.36	
Conservative	Colin Baxter	116	4.59	
Majority		1,251	49.67	
Turnout		2,569	28.4%	
Liberal Democrats hold		Swing		

=== Holderness ===
Holderness
Party	Candidate	Votes	%	±%
Liberal Democrats	Kalvin Neal*	1,238	51.80	
Labour	Christopher Sumpton	841	35.19	
Green	Helene Marks	198	8.28	
Conservative	Grant Clark	113	4.73	
Majority		397	16.61	
Turnout		2,477	27.22	
Liberal Democrats hold		Swing		

=== Ings ===
Ings
Party	Candidate	Votes	%	±%
Labour	Denise Thompson*	763	56.56	
Green	Julia Brown	211	15.64	
Conservative	Sam Barrick	197	14.60	
Liberal Democrats	Brian Tompsett	178	13.19	
Majority		552	40.92	
Turnout		1,409	19.81	
Labour hold		Swing		

=== Kingswood ===
Kingswood
Party	Candidate	Votes	%	±%
Liberal Democrats	Charles Quinn*	958	73.92	
Labour	Jide Williams	202	15.59	
Green	Mark Atherton	70	5.40	
Conservative	Christian Calgie	66	5.09	
Majority		756	58.33	
Turnout		1,323	21.70	
Liberal Democrats hold		Swing		

=== Longhill and Bilton Grange ===
Longhill and Bilton Grange
Party	Candidate	Votes	%	±%
Labour	Dean Kirk	872	61.71	
Liberal Democrats	James Dad	290	20.52	
Conservative	Les Fisher	251	17.76	
Majority		582	41.19	
Turnout		1,489	16.18	
Labour hold		Swing		

=== Marfleet ===
Marfleet
Party	Candidate	Votes	%	±%
Labour	Rosemary Pantelakis*	732	62.62	
Liberal Democrats	Margaret Tompsett	246	21.04	
Conservative	John Manners	191	16.34	
Majority		486	41.58	
Turnout		1,237	13.39	
Labour hold		Swing		

=== Newington and Gipsyville ===
Newington and Gipsyville
Party	Candidate	Votes	%	±%
Labour	Gillian Kennett*	801	47.01	
UKIP	Angela Shearsmith	468	27.46	
Liberal Democrats	Rebekkah Railton	307	18.02	
Conservative	Stephen Hackett	128	7.51	
Majority		333	19.55	
Turnout		1,724	16.32	
Labour hold		Swing		

=== North Carr ===
North Carr
Party	Candidate	Votes	%	±%
Labour	Philip Webster*	709	55.30	
Liberal Democrats	Ruth Thomson	242	18.88	
Green	James Russell	195	15.21	
Conservative	Lewis Ilsey	136	10.61	
Majority		467	36.42	
Turnout		1,342	13.9	
Labour hold		Swing		

=== Orchard Park ===
Orchard Park
Party	Candidate	Votes	%	±%
Labour	Gary Wareing*	1,013	65.31	
Liberal Democrats	Dominic Anderson	366	23.60	
Conservative	Farhana Naz-Khan	172	11.09	
Majority		647	41.71	
Turnout		1,643	15.48	
Labour hold		Swing		

=== Pickering ===
Pickering
Party	Candidate	Votes	%	±%
Liberal Democrats	Mark Ieronimo*	1,031	62.83	
Labour	Dawn Sullivan	498	30.35	
Conservative	Ruth Whitehead	112	6.83	
Majority		533	32.48	
Turnout		1,693	25.67	
Liberal Democrats hold		Swing		

=== Southcoates ===
Southcoates
Party	Candidate	Votes	%	±%
Labour	Michael Thompson*	1,091	67.51	
Liberal Democrats	Michael Chambers	332	20.54	
Conservative	Stephen Brown	193	11.94	
Majority		759	46.97	
Turnout		1,718	16.46	
Labour hold		Swing		

=== St Andrews and Docklands ===
St Andrews and Docklands
Party	Candidate	Votes	%	±%
Labour Co-op	Haroldo Herrera-Richmond*	985	53.42	
For Britain	Barry McGrath	267	14.48	
Liberal Democrats	Tracey Henry	241	13.07	
Green	Michael Havard	208	11.28	
Conservative	John Pegg	143	7.75	
Majority		718	38.94	
Turnout		1,868	18.03	
Labour Co-op hold		Swing		

=== Sutton ===
Sutton
Party	Candidate	Votes	%	±%
Liberal Democrats	Allen Healand	1,285	45.65	
Labour	Hannah Freeman	935	33.21	
Independent	Colin Worrall	247	8.77	
Conservative	Amy Dring	207	7.35	
Green	Richard Howarth	141	5.01	
Majority		350	12.44	
Turnout		2,858	27.58	
Liberal Democrats gain from Labour		Swing		

=== West Carr ===
West Carr
Party	Candidate	Votes	%	±%
Liberal Democrats	Christine Randall*	1,378	66.60	
Labour	Antonia O'Mullane	551	26.63	
Conservative	Brandon Henderson	140	6.77	
Majority		827	39.97	
Turnout		2,166	22.63	
Liberal Democrats hold		Swing		
