= 2024 Hull City Council election =

2024 election in Hull, England

- 2 May 2024

19 of 57 seats on Hull City Council 29 seats needed for a majority

	First party	Second party
Leader	Mike Ross	Daren Hale
Party	Liberal Democrats	Labour
Seats before	33	24
Seats won	9	10
Seats after	31	26
Seat change	▼2	▲2
Leader before election
Mike Ross
Liberal Democrats
Leader after election
Mike Ross
Liberal Democrats

Map of the results of the 2024 Hull council election. Labour in red, Liberal Democrats in yellow, Uncontested in cream.

The 2024 Hull City Council election was held on Thursday 2 May 2024 to elect members of Hull City Council. It took place on the same day as other local elections in the United Kingdom. Of the 57 seats on the council, 19 were up for election, being the usual third of the council. It resulted in a Liberal Democrats hold, with a reduced majority.

== Councillors standing down ==
Councillor	Ward	First elected	Party	Date announced
Steve Wilson	University	1995	Labour	30 October 2023
Rhys Furley	Sutton	2021	Liberal Democrat	

== Results summary ==
2024 Hull City Council election
Party	This election			Full council			This election		
Party	Seats	Net	Seats %	Other	Total	Total %	Votes	Votes %	+/−
Labour	10	▲1	52.6	17	27	47.4	15,914	44.1	+3.1
Liberal Democrats	9	▼1	47.4	21	30	52.6	15,865	44.0	-5.1
Conservative	0	Steady	0.0	0	0	0.0	2,119	5.9	-0.0
Green	0	Steady	0.0	0	0	0.0	901	2.5	+0.2
TUSC	0	Steady	0.0	0	0	0.0	509	1.4	+0.4
Reform	0	Steady	0.0	0	0	0.0	419	1.2	+0.8
Independent	0	Steady	0.0	0	0	0.0	280	0.8	New
Yorkshire	0	Steady	0.0	0	0	0.0	76	0.2	New

== Ward results ==
An asterisk (*) indicates an incumbent who stood for re-election.

No election took place in the Central and Pickering wards.

Percentage changes and swings are calculated using the 2023 results.

=== Avenue ===
Avenue
Party	Candidate	Votes	%	±%
Labour	Karen Wood	1,330	43.4	−7.6
Liberal Democrats	John Robinson*	1,225	40.0	+4.0
Green	James Russell	296	9.7	−0.4
TUSC	Michael Whale	108	3.5	New
Conservative	Alex Hayward	62	2.0	−0.9
Yorkshire	James Steele	42	1.4	New
Majority		105	3.4	
Rejected ballots		17		
Turnout		3,080	33.4	
Labour gain from Liberal Democrats		Swing	-5.8	

=== Beverley and Newland ===
Beverley and Newland
Party	Candidate	Votes	%	±%
Liberal Democrats	Mike Ross*	1,900	63.8	−3.5
Labour	Joanna Collins	851	28.6	+2.9
Conservative	Otis Griffin	117	3.9	−0.1
TUSC	Michael Hirst	108	3.6	+0.5
Majority		1049	35.2	
Rejected ballots		16		
Turnout		2,992	28.9	
Liberal Democrats hold		Swing	-3.2	

=== Boothferry ===
Boothferry
Party	Candidate	Votes	%	±%
Liberal Democrats	Alison Collinson*	1,165	54.9	−3.6
Labour	James Ireland	715	33.7	+0.6
Conservative	John Sharp	127	6.0	−2.7
Green	Archie Lamplugh	115	5.5	New
Majority		450	21.2	
Rejected ballots		9		
Turnout		2,123	24.0	
Liberal Democrats hold		Swing	2.1	

=== Bricknell ===
There was no election in the Bricknell ward in 2023, so the percentage changes and swings shown are from the 2022 results, when the seat was last up for election.

Bricknell
Party	Candidate	Votes	%	±%
Labour	Peter North*	1,138	56.1	+3.3
Liberal Democrats	Brian Gilliland	512	25.7	+20.2
Conservative	John Fareham	261	12.9	−22.9
Green	Kevin Paulson	76	3.7	−2.3
Yorkshire	Rowan Halstead	34	1.7	New
Majority		626	30.4	
Rejected ballots		11		
Turnout		2041	33.8	
Labour hold		Swing	-8.45	

=== Derringham ===
Derringham
Party	Candidate	Votes	%	±%
Labour	George Grozav	1,251	50.1	+11.4
Liberal Democrats	Daruis Kirtiklis	1,041	41.7	−12.7
Conservative	Mike Whitehead	108	4.3	−2.5
Green	Andy Donegan	96	3.9	New
Majority		210	8.4	
Rejected ballots		19		
Turnout		2515	27.9	
Labour gain from Liberal Democrats		Swing	+12.05	

=== Drypool ===
Drypool
Party	Candidate	Votes	%	±%
Liberal Democrats	Scott Preston	1,361	63.2	−4.3
Labour	Oscar Seal	541	25.1	+4.6
Green	John Allison-Walsh	128	6.0	+1.2
Conservative	Stephen Hackett	122	5.7	+0.6
Majority		820	38.1	
Rejected ballots		15		
Turnout		2167	24.3	
Liberal Democrats hold		Swing	-4.45	

=== Holderness ===
Holderness
Party	Candidate	Votes	%	±%
Liberal Democrats	Linda Tock*	1,331	60.5	−5.3
Labour	Jan Hornby	671	30.5	+1.1
TUSC	Paul Spooner	102	4.6	New
Conservative	Stephen Brown	95	4.3	−0.5
Majority		660	30.0	
Rejected ballots		12		
Turnout		2,211	25.2	
Liberal Democrats hold		Swing		

=== Ings ===
Ings
Party	Candidate	Votes	%	±%
Labour	Alan Gardiner*	929	53.9	+7.0
Liberal Democrats	Mark Bisbey	617	35.8	−4.9
Green	Gordon Bradshaw	102	5.9	+0.6
Conservative	Zia Vennoyer	76	4.4	−1.4
Majority		312	18.1	
Rejected ballots		19		
Turnout		1,743	24.4	
Labour hold		Swing	+5.95	

=== Kingswood ===
Kingswood
Party	Candidate	Votes	%	±%
Liberal Democrats	Ted Dolman	739	65.6	−8.5
Labour	Sofiya Koch	292	25.9	+5.3
Conservative	Ash Withers	96	8.5	+3.2
Majority		447	39.7	
Rejected ballots		10		
Turnout		1,137	16.6	
Liberal Democrats hold		Swing	-6.9	

=== Longhill and Bilton Grange ===
Longhill and Bilton Grange
Party	Candidate	Votes	%	±%
Liberal Democrats	Julia Conner* (Note: Originally elected as Labour)	815	52.5	+2.7
Labour	Dean Kirk	608	39.1	−0.7
Conservative	James Sargeant	75	4.8	−1.1
TUSC	Tony Smith	56	3.6	−1.0
Majority		207	13.4	
Rejected ballots		13		
Turnout		1567	18.0	
Liberal Democrats gain from Labour		Swing	+1.0	

=== Marfleet ===
Marfleet
Party	Candidate	Votes	%	±%
Labour	Sharon Belcher*	746	71.1	+2.0
Liberal Democrats	Curtiss Craig	205	19.5	−2.2
Conservative	Geoff Horton	99	9.4	+0.2
Majority		541	51.6	
Rejected ballots		15		
Turnout		1065	11.6	
Labour hold		Swing	+2.1	

=== Newington and Gipsyville ===
Newington and Gipsyville
Party	Candidate	Votes	%	±%
Labour	Tracy Dearing*	1,050	66.0	+7.3
Liberal Democrats	Keith Smith	363	22.7	−0.4
Conservative	Daniel Bond	178	11.2	+0.9
Majority		687	43.3	
Rejected ballots		32		
Turnout		1623	15.5	
Labour hold		Swing	+3.85	

=== North Carr ===
North Carr
Party	Candidate	Votes	%	±%
Labour	Paul Harper	556	42.3	+2.4
Liberal Democrats	Jan Loft*	540	41.1	−13.5
Reform	Martin Baker	169	12.9	New
Conservative	Graeme Whightman	49	3.7	−1.7
Majority		16	1.2	
Rejected ballots		4		
Turnout		1318	13	
Labour gain from Liberal Democrats		Swing	+7.95	

=== Orchard Park ===
Orchard Park
Party	Candidate	Votes	%	±%
Labour	Rosie Nicola*	999	62.4	+13.8
Liberal Democrats	Brian Tompsett	324	20.2	−24.2
Independent	John Gilling	169	10.6	New
Conservative	John Rymer	109	6.8	+3.5
Majority		675	42.2	
Rejected ballots		12		
Turnout		1,612	15.9	
Labour hold		Swing	+19.0	

=== Southcoates ===
After the closure of nominations, Ian Broadbent was suspended from Reform UK after offensive social media posts on X (formerly Twitter) were discovered. He remained on the ballot as nominations had already closed.

Southcoates
Party	Candidate	Votes	%	±%
Labour	Hester Bridges*	1,099	66.4	+1.1
Reform	Ian Broadbent	250	15.1	+5.6
Liberal Democrats	Brian Gurevitch	210	12.7	−4.1
Conservative	Archie Bartlett	97	5.9	−2.1
Majority		849	51.3	
Rejected ballots		8		
Turnout		1664	15.6	
Labour hold		Swing	-2.25	

=== St Andrew's and Docklands ===
St Andrew's and Docklands
Party	Candidate	Votes	%	±%
Labour	Daren Hale*	1,183	67.5	+6.4
Liberal Democrats	Callum Best	322	19.0	−0.4
Conservative	Charles Dinsdale	123	7.1	−0.7
Independent	Barry McGrath	112	6.4	New
Majority		861	48.5	
Rejected ballots		19		
Turnout		1771	16.8	
Labour hold		Swing	+3.4	

=== Sutton ===
Sutton
Party	Candidate	Votes	%	±%
Liberal Democrats	Jonathan Cahill	1,465	61.6	+0.7
Labour	Rob Dunstan	763	32.1	−1.3
Conservative	Frankie Williams	151	6.4	+0.6
Majority		702	29.5	
Rejected ballots		25		
Turnout		2404	24.2	
Liberal Democrats hold		Swing	+1.0	

=== University ===
There was no election in the University ward in 2023, so the percentage changes and swings shown are from the 2022 results, when the seat was last up for election.

University
Party	Candidate	Votes	%	±%
Liberal Democrats	Mark Collinson	728	48.0	−5.2
Labour	Sian Humphries	644	42.4	+6.0
Green	Claire Wildey	88	5.8	+1.9
Conservative	Ben Lavender	58	3.8	−2.7
Majority		84	5.6	
Rejected ballots		16		
Turnout		1534	24	
Liberal Democrats gain from Labour		Swing	-5.6	

=== West Carr ===
West Carr
Party	Candidate	Votes	%	±%
Liberal Democrats	Tracey Neal*	992	55.7	+3.6
Labour	Finn Anderson	548	31.3	−2.6
Conservative	Colin Baxter	116	6.6	−2.1
TUSC	Joyce Marshall	95	5.4	+1.1
Majority		444	24.4	
Rejected ballots		10		
Turnout		1,761	19.5	
Liberal Democrats hold		Swing	+3.1	
