= 2008 Hull City Council election =

2008 UK local government election

Map of the results of the 2008 Hull council election. Labour in red, Liberal Democrats in yellow, Conservatives in blue, Uncontested in cream.

The 2008 Hull City Council election took place on 1 May 2008 to elect members of Hull City Council in England. One third of the council was up for election and the Liberal Democrats retained control of the council with an increased majority from a situation of ruling under no overall control.

After the election, the composition of the council was

- Liberal Democrat 33
- Labour 19
- N.E.W. Hull Independent 3
- Conservative 2
- Independent 1
- Non-aligned 1

== Campaign ==
At the 2007 election the Liberal Democrats had won an overall majority of 1 but subsequently suffered 2 defections meaning that they went into the 2008 election as a minority administration. In total 81 candidates stood in the 2008 election including 20 each from the Liberal Democrats, Labour and Conservative parties. Other candidates standing in the election came from the English Democrats, Greens and United Kingdom Independence Party as well as some independents candidates. The Liberal Democrats were expected to recover seats in the election which they had lost when councillors had defected to sit as independents.

== Election result ==
The results saw the Liberal Democrats regain a majority on the council after gaining 5 seats. They won Newington and Pickering wards from Labour, as well as Beverley, Boothferry and Derringham wards from independents. Labour did make one gain in St Andrews from an independent and saw their former leader, Colin Inglis, returned to the council in Myton. The Liberal Democrats now controlled 33 seats on the council as compared to 19 for Labour. Overall turnout in the election was 25.5%.

Hull local election result 2008
Party	Seats	Gains	Losses	Net gain/loss	Seats %	Votes %	Votes	+/−
Liberal Democrats	12	5	0	+5	60.0	41.7	17,142	-4.4%
Labour	7	1	2	-1	35.0	34.1	14,025	-1.9%
Conservative	1	0	0	0	5.0	14.0	5,768	+6.2%
Independent	0	0	1	-1	0	4.9	1,998	-0.5%
English Democrat	0	0	0	0	0	2.2	894	+2.2%
Green	0	0	0	0	0	1.8	743	-0.3%
UKIP	0	0	0	0	0	1.2	499	-0.1%
N.E.W. Hull Independent	0	0	3	-3	0	0	0	0

== Ward results ==
Avenue
Party	Candidate	Votes	%	±%
Liberal Democrats	John Graham Robinson	1,496	51.7	+8.1
Labour	Andy Dorton	807	27.9	+0.0
Green	Martin John Deane	295	10.2	−5.5
Conservative	David Triffit Whellan	204	7.0	−0.6
Independent	Ginette Andrew	93	3.2	−2.0
Majority		689	23.8	+8.1
Turnout		2,895	32.9	+0.5
Liberal Democrats hold		Swing		

Beverley
Party	Candidate	Votes	%	±%
Liberal Democrats	Karen Elizabeth Mathieson	1,336	55.3	−17.1
Independent	Joyce Korczak Fields	449	18.6	+18.6
Labour	Mike Whiting	346	14.3	−0.9
Conservative	Marc James Pooler	221	9.2	−0.3
Green	David John Allen	62	2.6	−0.3
Majority		887	36.7	−20.5
Turnout		2,414	35.9	−1.0
Liberal Democrats gain from Independent		Swing		

Boothferry
Party	Candidate	Votes	%	±%
Liberal Democrats	Chris Gurevitch	1,057	41.9	−9.5
Labour	Mall Fields	635	25.2	−5.4
English Democrat	Graham Anthony Robinson	331	13.1	+13.1
Conservative	Karen Anne Woods	298	11.8	−0.1
Independent	Keith Toon	118	4.7	+4.7
UKIP	Brian Shepherd	85	3.4	−2.7
Majority		422	16.7	−4.1
Turnout		2,524	26.5	−3.0
Liberal Democrats gain from N.E.W. Hull Independent		Swing		

Bricknell
Party	Candidate	Votes	%	±%
Conservative	Andrew Percy	1,550	67.1	+1.4
Labour	Helene O'Mullane	414	17.9	+0.2
Liberal Democrats	Phillip Morrell	234	10.1	−6.5
Green	James Edward Russell	113	4.9	+4.9
Majority		1,136	49.2	+1.2
Turnout		2,311	36.1	−2.6
Conservative hold		Swing		

Derringham
Party	Candidate	Votes	%	±%
Liberal Democrats	Martin Uzzell	846	40.6	−10.9
Labour	Carol Ann Clarkson	471	22.6	+1.5
Independent	Michael Vernon Rouse-Deane	351	16.9	+8.6
UKIP	John Henry Cornforth	227	10.9	−0.6
Conservative	Reg Britton	188	9.0	+3.5
Majority		375	18.0	−12.4
Turnout		2,083	23.7	−3.4
Liberal Democrats gain from N.E.W. Hull Independent		Swing		

Drypool
Party	Candidate	Votes	%	±%
Liberal Democrats	Adam Williams	1,756	63.9	+11.8
Labour	Dave Craker	762	27.7	−11.4
Conservative	Neil James Cropper	229	8.3	+3.9
Majority		994	36.2	+23.2
Turnout		2,747	28.9	−2.3
Liberal Democrats hold		Swing		

Holderness
Party	Candidate	Votes	%	±%
Liberal Democrats	John Nicholson	1,465	54.9	−0.2
Labour	Graham Petrini	719	26.9	−2.5
Conservative	Stephen Rowland Brown	340	12.7	+4.2
Independent	Janet Hilda Toker	146	5.5	−1.4
Majority		746	27.9	+2.2
Turnout		2,670	26.8	−1.2
Liberal Democrats hold		Swing		

Ings
Party	Candidate	Votes	%	±%
Liberal Democrats	Allen Frederick Healand	1,584	53.3	+3.9
Labour	Tracy Catherine Noon	942	31.7	−7.5
Conservative	Andrew Neil Forster	286	9.6	+3.1
Independent	Mally Reeve	160	5.4	+0.5
Majority		642	21.6	+11.4
Turnout		2,972	31.0	−0.6
Liberal Democrats hold		Swing		

Kings Park
Party	Candidate	Votes	%	±%
Liberal Democrats	Elaine Anne Garland	966	64.5	+4.0
Labour	Brian Arthur Petch	335	22.4	−4.9
Conservative	Andrew Allison	197	13.2	+3.3
Majority		631	42.1	+8.9
Turnout		1,498	23.5	−1.7
Liberal Democrats hold		Swing		

Longhill
Party	Candidate	Votes	%	±%
Labour	John Allen Hewitt	867	46.7	−9.9
Liberal Democrats	Chris Lefevre	466	25.1	+6.2
Independent	Peter Robert Martin	270	14.5	+2.0
Conservative	Ian Matthew Brown	253	13.6	+1.6
Majority		401	21.6	−16.1
Turnout		1,856	21.7	−1.7
Labour hold		Swing		

Marfleet
Party	Candidate	Votes	%	±%
Labour	Sheila Waudby	973	61.5	+2.2
Liberal Democrats	Julie Ann Hunt	309	19.5	+1.6
Conservative	Les Fisher	301	19.0	+8.7
Majority		664	41.9	+0.5
Turnout		1,583	17.8	−0.8
Labour hold		Swing		

Myton
Party	Candidate	Votes	%	±%
Labour	Colin Inglis	869	45.1	−3.7
Liberal Democrats	Peter Josef Welton	344	17.8	+4.5
Conservative	Peter Laurence Abraham	294	15.2	+6.3
UKIP	Ken Hordon	187	9.7	+6.2
Green	Susan Harr	147	7.6	+2.1
Independent	Min Benson	87	4.5	−5.0
Majority		525	27.2	−8.3
Turnout		1,928	20.2	−1.8
Labour hold		Swing		

Newington
Party	Candidate	Votes	%	±%
Liberal Democrats	Craig Charles Woolmer	962	47.6	+2.8
Labour	Lynn Petrini	743	36.8	−3.9
English Democrat	Richard Howard	192	9.5	+9.5
Conservative	Pat Thompson	124	6.1	+1.8
Majority		219	10.8	+6.7
Turnout		2,021	24.9	+2.8
Liberal Democrats gain from Labour		Swing		

Newland
Party	Candidate	Votes	%	±%
Liberal Democrats	Michael James Ross	720	55.8	+0.4
Labour	Martin Charles Mancey	326	25.3	−0.3
Green	Louise Muston	126	9.8	−0.7
Conservative	Andrew Mary Singleton	118	9.1	+0.7
Majority		394	30.5	+0.7
Turnout		1,290	21.0	−0.8
Liberal Democrats hold		Swing		

Orchard Park & Greenwood
Party	Candidate	Votes	%	±%
Labour	Steven James Bayes	1,011	65.6	−5.1
Liberal Democrats	Charles Quinn	295	19.1	+0.4
Conservative	James Parker	235	15.2	+4.6
Majority		716	46.5	−5.5
Turnout		1,541	17.3	−0.4
Labour hold		Swing		

Pickering
Party	Candidate	Votes	%	±%
Liberal Democrats	Claire Thomas	1,247	46.4	−6.4
Labour	Peter Allen	1,001	37.2	−1.6
Conservative	Robert David Brown	223	8.3	−0.1
English Democrat	Sharon Mawer	217	8.1	+8.1
Majority		246	9.2	−4.8
Turnout		2,688	30.1	+0.7
Liberal Democrats gain from Labour		Swing		

Southcoates East
Party	Candidate	Votes	%	±%
Labour	Tom McVie	630	62.7	+7.3
Liberal Democrats	Elizabeth Ann Gurevitch	199	19.8	−0.8
Conservative	Douglas Colin Percy	175	17.4	+7.2
Majority		431	42.9	+8.1
Turnout		1,004	17.7	−0.6
Labour hold		Swing		

Southcoates West
Party	Candidate	Votes	%	±%
Labour	Mary Glew	980	71.3	+15.9
Liberal Democrats	Ann Godden	212	15.4	−5.2
Conservative	John Francis Abbott	182	13.2	+3.0
Majority		768	55.9	+21.1
Turnout		1,374	22.9	+4.6
Labour hold		Swing		

St Andrews
Party	Candidate	Votes	%	±%
Labour	Daren Russell Hale	421	40.3	+3.3
Independent	Albert Penna	324	31.0	+31.0
English Democrat	Graham Anthony Robinson	154	14.7	+14.7
Conservative	Bob Cook	78	7.5	+3.5
Liberal Democrats	Robyn Emma Randall	68	6.5	−26.7
Majority		97	9.3	+5.5
Turnout		1,045	21.0	−2.8
Labour gain from N.E.W. Hull Independent		Swing		

Sutton
Party	Candidate	Votes	%	±%
Liberal Democrats	Kalvin Glen Neal	1,580	60.2	−2.9
Labour	Kenneth William Turner	773	29.4	−1.8
Conservative	Sheila Gladys Airey	272	10.4	+4.7
Majority		807	30.7	−1.2
Turnout		2,625	27.4	−4.4
Liberal Democrats hold		Swing		

No elections were held in Bransholme East, Bransholme West and University wards.
