= 2015 Hull City Council election =

2015 UK local government election

Map of the results of the 2015 Hull council election. Labour in red, Liberal Democrats in yellow, Uncontested in cream.

The 2015 Hull City Council election took place on 7 May 2015 to elect members of Hull City Council in England. This was on the same day as other local elections.

One third of the council was up for election and Labour retained control of the council.

After the election, the composition of the council was

- Labour 40
- Liberal Democrat 15
- Conservative 2
- Hull Red Labour 1
- UK Independence 1

== Ward results ==
No elections were held in Bricknell, St Andrews, Southcoates East and Southcoates West wards.
