= Stephen Brady (British politician) =

British politician

Stephen Brady OBE (born in Hull in 1945) is a former British politician who was the Leader of Hull City Council, a unitary authority, from 2011 for the Labour Party. He stepped down from the position after the 2021 election. In 2018 he was appointed an Officer of the Order of the British Empire (OBE) following the success of Hull UK City of Culture 2017.

== Life and work ==
Stephen Brady, known as Steve Brady, was born in Hull in 1945. His father was a dock worker who served in the Royal Navy during the Second World War. He is of Irish descent. In his teens he was a member of the Young Christian Workers. Brady spent much of his working life at BP, Saltend, near Hull and later ran a newsagents shop in East Hull. A long-time trade unionist and Labour Party member, he was elected Councillor of Southcoates Ward (formerly Southcoates West Ward) in 2000 and became Leader of the Labour Group in 2007.

== As council leader ==
Since becoming Council Leader in 2011, Brady has been praised for his leadership as the city gained improvements in the areas of investment, industry, green energy, employment prospects, and cultural events. Hull was selected as UK City of Culture for 2017, a decision widely received with scepticism and cynicism initially. The event met with considerable success and acclaim and resulted in verifiable, lasting benefits for the city such as jobs, investment, increased visitor numbers, unprecedented media coverage, and widespread community participation. Though he was re-elected to his post as council leader in 2019 to serve through to 2022, Brady announced in May 2021 he was to stand down as leader that month, following local elections where the party had lost seats to the opposition Liberal Democrats. Brady was awarded the OBE in the 2018 New Year Honours for services to local government.

== Personal and family life ==
Brady has been married for nearly fifty years and has six children. He lives at the family home in East Hull. His uncle Charles (Charlie) Brady (1916–1992) and aunt Frances (Grogan) (1916–2013) also served as councillors in Hull during the 1960s and 1970s.
