= 2021 Hull City Council election =

2021 UK local government election

Map of the results of the 2021 Hull council election. Labour in red, Liberal Democrats in yellow, Uncontested in cream.

The 2021 Hull City Council election took place on 6 May 2021 to elect members of Hull City Council in England. This was on the same day as other nationwide local elections. In March 2020 the government announced that the elections scheduled for 7 May 2020 would be delayed for a year due to the COVID-19 pandemic. They were now held at the same time as the elections previously scheduled for 2021. Following a review of Ward boundaries by the Local Government Boundary Commission for England (LGBCE) the whole council was elected in 2018, the 2nd placed winning candidate at that election is up for re-election in 2021. The Labour Party was defending overall control of the council.

There were no elections in Central or Pickering wards, being two member wards and not being on this round of the three-year cycle.

This result had the following consequences for the total number of seats on the Council after the elections:

Party	Previous council	New council	+/-
Labour	31	30	–1
Liberal Democrats	24	26	+2
Conservatives	2	1	–1
Total	57	57	
Working majority	5	3	

== Results summary ==
2021 Hull City Council election
Party	This election			Full council			This election		
Party	Seats	Net	Seats %	Other	Total	Total %	Votes	Votes %	+/−
Labour	9	▼1	47.4	21	30	52.6	14,842	35.5	-4.6
Liberal Democrats	10	▲2	52.6	16	26	45.6	16,251	38.9	-4.1
Conservative	0	▼1	0.0	1	1	1.8	7,695	18.4	+10.9
Green	0	Steady	0.0	0	0	0.0	1,792	4.3	-1.4
Independent	0	Steady	0.0	0	0	0.0	660	1.6	-0.1
TUSC	0	Steady	0.0	0	0	0.0	317	0.8	New
For Britain	0	Steady	0.0	0	0	0.0	130	0.3	-0.4
Yorkshire	0	Steady	0.0	0	0	0.0	69	0.2	New
SDP	0	Steady	0.0	0	0	0.0	45	0.1	New

== Ward results ==
An asterisk * indicates an incumbent who stood for re-election.

Turnout figures where stated are the number of ballot papers handed out in a ward including any rejected ballot papers.

=== Avenue ===
Avenue
Party	Candidate	Votes	%	±%
Liberal Democrats	John Robinson*	1,759	46.88	+4.06
Labour	Karen Wood	1,297	34.57	−8.68
Green	James Russell	364	9.70	−1.20
Conservative	Alexander Hayward	189	5.04	+2.02
Independent	Adam Hawley	143	3.81	N/A
Majority		462		
Turnout		3,763	40.05	
Rejected ballots		28		
Registered electors		9,396		
Liberal Democrats hold		Swing		

=== Beverley and Newland ===
Beverley and Newland
Party	Candidate	Votes	%	±%
Liberal Democrats	Mike Ross*	1,973	64.12	−0.40
Labour	Hannah Freeman	578	18.78	−4.17
Conservative	James Sargeant	303	9.85	+5.63
Green	Deborah Newton	223	7.25	−1.06
Majority		1,395		
Turnout		3,107	29.71	
Rejected ballots		28		
Registered electors		10,459		
Liberal Democrats hold		Swing		

=== Boothferry ===
Boothferry
Party	Candidate	Votes	%	±%
Liberal Democrats	Alison Collison	1,320	51.28	−1.12
Labour Co-op	Jessica Raspin	630	24.48	−4.06
Conservative	John Sharp	472	18.34	+12.03
Green	Luke Shaw	96	3.73	−1.64
Independent	Ben Morgan	56	2.18	−5.19
Majority		690		
Turnout		2,504	26.90	
Rejected ballots		14		
Registered electors		9,308		
Liberal Democrats hold		Swing		

=== Bricknell ===
Bricknell
Party	Candidate	Votes	%	±%
Labour	Peter North	1,126	47.69	+3.96
Conservative	Richard Royal	964	40.83	−4.90
Green	Kevin Paulson	169	7.16	N/A
Liberal Democrats	Sarita Robinson	102	4.32	−0.09
Majority		162		
Turnout		2,379	37.91	
Rejected ballots		18		
Registered electors		6,275		
Labour gain from Conservative		Swing		

There was no election in Bricknell ward in 2019, so changes are shown from the 2018 election.

=== Derringham ===
Derringham
Party	Candidate	Votes	%	±%
Liberal Democrats	David Woods	979	45.01	−6.74
Labour	Sarah Hicks	576	26.48	+0.92
Conservative	Daniel Bond	419	19.26	+13.19
Independent	Rod Grimmer	168	7.72	N/A
For Britain	Justyna Joniak	33	1.52	N/A
Majority		403		
Turnout		2,182	23.30	
Rejected ballots		7		
Registered electors		9,365		
Liberal Democrats hold		Swing		

=== Drypool ===
Drypool
Party	Candidate	Votes	%	±%
Liberal Democrats	Tracey Neal	1,667	62.34	−6.52
Labour	Tony Smith	515	19.29	+0.10
Conservative	Stephen Brown	305	11.41	+6.82
Green	John Allison-Walsh	110	4.11	−3.25
Yorkshire	James Steele	69	2.58	N/A
SDP	John Waterston	8	0.30	N/A
Majority		1,152		
Turnout		2,716	29.50	
Rejected ballots		41		
Registered electors		9,208		
Liberal Democrats hold		Swing		

=== Holderness ===
Holderness
Party	Candidate	Votes	%	±%
Liberal Democrats	Linda Tock*	1,445	54.22	+2.42
Labour	Anna Thompson	701	26.30	−8.89
Conservative	Owen McConaghy	403	15.12	+10.39
Green	Gordon Bradshaw	116	4.35	−3.93
Majority		735		
Turnout		2,681	29.75	
Rejected ballots		15		
Registered electors		9,011		
Liberal Democrats hold		Swing		

=== Ings ===
Ings
Party	Candidate	Votes	%	±%
Labour	Alan Gardiner*	803	47.04	−9.52
Conservative	Curt Pugh	448	26.24	+11.64
Green	Julia Brown	243	14.24	−1.40
Liberal Democrats	Brian Gurevitch	213	12.48	−0.71
Majority		355		
Turnout		1,722	23.98	
Rejected ballots		16		
Registered electors		7,182		
Labour hold		Swing		

=== Kingswood ===
Kingswood
Party	Candidate	Votes	%	±%
Liberal Democrats	Mark Bisbey*	974	71.04	−2.88
Conservative	Sean McMaster	208	15.17	+10.08
Labour	Oljide Williams	178	12.98	−2.61
SDP	Helen Jackman	11	0.80	N/A
Majority		466		
Turnout		1,382	20.84	
Rejected ballots		11		
Registered electors		6,633		
Liberal Democrats hold		Swing		

=== Longhill and Bilton Grange ===
Longhill and Bilton Grange
Party	Candidate	Votes	%	±%
Labour	Julia Conner*	869	51.94	−9.77
Conservative	Angus West	508	30.36	+12.60
Liberal Democrats	Terence Keal	296	17.69	−2.83
Majority		361		
Turnout		1,686	18.48	
Rejected ballots		13		
Registered electors		9,121		
Labour hold		Swing		

=== Marfleet ===
Marfleet
Party	Candidate	Votes	%	±%
Labour	Sharon Belcher	674	50.98	−11.64
Conservative	John Rymer	299	22.62	+6.28
Independent	Magnus Murray	190	14.37	N/A
Liberal Democrats	Karen Woods	122	9.23	−11.81
TUSC	Michael Hirst	37	2.80	N/A
Majority		375		
Turnout		1,340	14.62	
Rejected ballots		17		
Registered electors		9,164		
Labour hold		Swing		

=== Newington and Gipsyville ===
Newington and Gipsyville
Party	Candidate	Votes	%	±%
Labour	Tracey Dearing	937	51.01	+4.00
Conservative	Simon Trow	450	24.50	+16.99
Liberal Democrats	Carrie Dunhill	261	14.21	−3.81
Green	Michael Havard	89	4.84	N/A
TUSC	Trisha Carlisle	51	2.78	N/A
For Britain	Stuart Lill	49	2.67	N/A
Majority		487		
Turnout		1,852	17.16	
Rejected ballots		15		
Registered electors		10,791		
Labour hold		Swing		

=== North Carr ===
North Carr
Party	Candidate	Votes	%	±%
Liberal Democrats	Jan Loft	728	46.22	+27.34
Labour	Peter Clark	541	34.35	−20.95
Conservative	Graeme Wightman	268	17.02	+6.41
TUSC	Gary Hammond	38	2.41	N/A
Majority		187		
Turnout		1,590	15.93	
Rejected ballots		15		
Registered electors		9,982		
Liberal Democrats gain from Labour		Swing		

=== Orchard Park ===
Orchard Park
Party	Candidate	Votes	%	±%
Labour	Rosie Nicola	958	55.41	−9.90
Conservative	Farhana Khan	378	21.86	+10.77
Liberal Democrats	Brian Tompsett	227	13.13	−10.47
Green	Francesca Dale	95	5.49	N/A
TUSC	Richard McManus	71	4.11	N/A
Majority		580		
Turnout		1,748	16.55	
Rejected ballots		19		
Registered electors		10,564		
Labour hold		Swing		

=== Southcoates ===
Southcoates
Party	Candidate	Votes	%	±%
Labour	Hester Bridges*	1,096	55.19	−12.32
Conservative	Jason Hotham	580	29.20	+17.26
Liberal Democrats	Michael Chambers	310	15.61	−4.93
Majority		516		
Turnout		2,008	19.09	
Rejected ballots		22		
Registered electors		10,520		
Labour hold		Swing		

=== St Andrews and Docklands ===
St Andrews and Docklands
Party	Candidate	Votes	%	±%
Labour Co-op	Daren Hale*	1,186	49.56	−3.86
Liberal Democrats	Tracey Henry	723	30.21	+17.14
Conservative	Malcolm Pearson	230	9.61	+1.86
Green	Iain Bartholomew	99	4.14	−7.14
Independent	Simon Pickering	67	2.80	N/A
For Britain	Barry McGrath	48	2.01	−12.47
TUSC	Paul Spooner	40	1.67	N/A
Majority		463		
Turnout		2,410	22.68	
Rejected ballots		17		
Registered electors		10,624		
Labour Co-op hold		Swing		

=== Sutton ===
Sutton
Party	Candidate	Votes	%	±%
Liberal Democrats	Rhys Furley	1,724	52.07	+6.42
Labour	Dave Craker*	975	29.45	−3.76
Conservative	Stephen Hackett	464	14.01	+6.66
Green	Richard Howarth	88	2.66	−2.35
Independent	Colin Worrall	36	1.09	−7.68
TUSC	Philip Culshaw	24	0.72	N/A
Majority		749		
Turnout		3,337	32.38	
Rejected ballots		26		
Registered electors		10,306		
Liberal Democrats gain from Labour		Swing		

=== University ===
University
Party	Candidate	Votes	%	±%
Labour	Steve Wilson*	695	49.61	+0.55
Conservative	Mike Whitehead	356	25.41	+8.80
Liberal Democrats	Joshua Ingham	250	17.84	+6.98
Green	Isabel Pires	100	7.14	−2.46
Majority		339		
Turnout		1,418	19.95	
Rejected ballots		17		
Registered electors		7,109		
Labour hold		Swing		

There was no election in University ward in 2019, so changes are shown from the 2018 election.

=== West Carr ===
West Carr
Party	Candidate	Votes	%	±%
Liberal Democrats	Chris Randall*	1,178	53.11	−13.49
Labour	Penny Rodmell	507	22.86	−3.77
Conservative	Colin Baxter	451	20.33	+13.56
TUSC	James Bentley	56	2.52	N/A
SDP	Lauren Vargues	26	1.17	N/A
Majority		671		
Turnout		2,242	23.79	
Rejected ballots		21		
Registered electors		9,423		
Liberal Democrats hold		Swing		
