= 2011 Hull City Council election =

2011 UK local government election

Map of the results of the 2011 Hull council election. Labour in red, Liberal Democrats in yellow, Uncontested in cream.

The 2011 Hull City Council election took place on 5 May 2011 to elect members of Hull City Council in England. One third of the council was up for election and Labour gained control of the council from the Liberal Democrats.

After the election, the composition of the council was:

- Labour 34
- Liberal Democrat 22
- Conservative 2
- Independent 1

== Ward results ==
No elections were held in Bricknell, St Andrews, Southcoates East and Southcoates West wards.

=== Avenue ===
Avenue
Party	Candidate	Votes	%	±%
Labour	Andy Dorton	1,770	45.6	
Liberal Democrats	David Woods	1,250	32.2	
Green	Martin John Deane	493	12.7	
Conservative	Alexander David Hayward	245	6.3	
UKIP	Paul Barlow	120	3.1	
Majority		520	13.3	
Turnout		3,899	40.9	
Labour gain from Liberal Democrats		Swing		

=== Beverley ===
Beverley
Party	Candidate	Votes	%	±%
Liberal Democrats	David McCobb	1,591	51.5	
Labour	Leanne Fudge	965	31.2	
UKIP	Vicky Butler	311	10.1	
Conservative	Andrew Neil Forster	171	5.5	
TUSC	Paul Spooner	52	1.7	
Majority		626	20.1	
Turnout		3,109	45.6	
Liberal Democrats hold		Swing		

=== Boothferry ===
Boothferry
Party	Candidate	Votes	%	±%
Liberal Democrats	Karen Woods	1,432	41.3	
Labour	Theresa Elizabeth Vaughan	1,402	40.5	
Conservative	Daniel Joseph Frazer	260	7.5	
UKIP	Brian Shepherd	204	5.9	
English Democrat	David Rust	166	4.8	
Majority		30	0.9	
Turnout		3,483	36.4	
Liberal Democrats hold		Swing		

=== Bransholme East ===
Bransholme East
Party	Candidate	Votes	%	±%
Labour	Peter Clark	955	59.9	
Independent	Janet McCoid	468	29.4	
Liberal Democrats	Alex Dunn	85	5.3	
Conservative	Richard James Munslow	85	5.3	
Majority		487	30.4	
Turnout		1,600	23.5	
Labour gain from N.E.W. Hull Independent		Swing		

=== Bransholme West ===
Bransholme West
Party	Candidate	Votes	%	±%
Labour	Helene O'Mullane	1,200	80.0	
Liberal Democrats	Aimi Sugarman	199	13.3	
Conservative	Colin Robert Baxter	101	6.7	
Majority		1,001	65.8	
Turnout		1,521	25.5	
Labour hold		Swing		

=== Derringham ===
Derringham
Party	Candidate	Votes	%	±%
Labour	Dean Kirk	1,243	41.6	
Liberal Democrats	Helena Woods	1,139	38.2	
UKIP	John Henry Cornforth	268	9.0	
Conservative	Craig William Ulliott	215	7.2	
English Democrat	Billy Hughes	120	4.0	
Majority		104	3.5	
Turnout		3,003	33.7	
Labour gain from Liberal Democrats		Swing		

=== Drypool ===
Drypool
Party	Candidate	Votes	%	±%
Labour	Gary Wareing	1,683	50.2	
Liberal Democrats	Angela Elizabeth Wastling	1,395	41.6	
National Front	Stuart Anthony Moses	142	4.2	
Conservative	James Parker	135	4.0	
Majority		288	11.8	
Turnout		3,376	35.4	
Labour gain from Liberal Democrats		Swing		

=== Holderness ===
Holderness
Party	Candidate	Votes	%	±%
Labour	Christopher Andrew Sumpton	2,172	55.9	
Liberal Democrats	Yvonne Uzzell	1,384	35.6	
Conservative	John Mathew Crompton	329	8.5	
Majority		788	20.2	
Turnout		3,903	38.6	
Labour gain from Liberal Democrats		Swing		

=== Ings ===
Ings
Party	Candidate	Votes	%	±%
Labour	Alan David Gardiner	2,225	64.4	
Liberal Democrats	Jackie Dad	763	22.1	
Conservative	Philip David MacKay	291	8.4	
National Front	Dave Stevens	177	5.1	
Majority		1,462	42.0	
Turnout		3,480	37.0	
Labour gain from Liberal Democrats		Swing		

=== Kings Park ===
Kings Park
Party	Candidate	Votes	%	±%
Labour	Danny Brown	1,211	47.2	
Liberal Democrats	Carl Minns	1,062	41.4	
Conservative	Thomas Peter Harlow	171	6.7	
Green	Mark Gretton	124	4.8	
Majority		149	5.8	
Turnout		2,568	34.8	
Labour gain from Liberal Democrats		Swing		

=== Longhill ===
Longhill
Party	Candidate	Votes	%	±%
Labour	John Arthur Black	1,855	73.5	
Conservative	Leslie Harry Fisher	278	11.0	
Liberal Democrats	Susie Whitaker	261	10.3	
National Front	Mike Cooper	131	5.2	
Majority		1,577	61.7	
Turnout		2,555	29.6	
Labour hold		Swing		

=== Marfleet ===
Marfleet
Party	Candidate	Votes	%	±%
Labour	Rosemary Pantelakis	1,768	77.2	
Conservative	Simon Schofield	202	8.8	
Liberal Democrats	Brian Charles Tompsett	161	7.0	
BNP	Jason Paul Carr	159	6.9	
Majority		1,566	67.9	
Turnout		2,307	25.1	
Labour hold		Swing		

=== Myton ===
Myton
Party	Candidate	Votes	%	±%
Labour	Rilba Mary Jones	1,460	60.6	
UKIP	Ken Hordon	290	12.0	
Liberal Democrats	Ali Motokin	239	9.9	
Conservative	Clare Marie Gascoigne	209	8.7	
Green	Theresa Jane White	134	5.6	
National Front	Nick Walsh	78	3.2	
Majority		1170	47.9	
Turnout		2,444	24.6	
Labour hold		Swing		

=== Newington ===
Newington
Party	Candidate	Votes	%	±%
Labour	Lynn Petrini	1,204	57.1	
Liberal Democrats	Rick Welton	660	31.3	
English Democrat	Tineke Shayne Robinson	143	6.8	
Conservative	Robert Anthony Cook	102	4.8	
Majority		544	25.6	
Turnout		2,121	26.8	
Labour gain from Liberal Democrats		Swing		

=== Newland ===
Newland
Party	Candidate	Votes	%	±%
Labour	John William Shipley	829	42.6	
Liberal Democrats	Mark Iain Collinson	723	37.1	
Green	Michael John Lammiman	162	8.3	
Conservative	Thomas Andrew Oliver	130	6.7	
UKIP	Stan Smith	104	5.3	
Majority		106	5.4	
Turnout		1,968	26.5	
Labour gain from Liberal Democrats		Swing		

=== Orchard Park & Greenwood ===
Orchard Park & Greenwood
Party	Candidate	Votes	%	±%
Labour	Julia Conner	1,705	81.5	
Liberal Democrats	Chris Randall	239	11.4	
Conservative	David Triffitt Whellan	147	7.0	
Majority		1,466	69.0	
Turnout		2,126	23.1	
Labour hold		Swing		

=== Pickering ===
Pickering
Party	Candidate	Votes	%	±%
Labour	Pete Allen	1,658	51.1	
Liberal Democrats	Sarita Bush	1,203	37.1	
English Democrat	Peter Mawer	212	6.5	
Conservative	Daniel Mark Bond	169	5.2	
Majority		455	13.9	
Turnout		3,272	36.3	
Labour gain from Liberal Democrats		Swing		

=== Sutton ===
Sutton
Party	Candidate	Votes	%	±%
Labour	David Alan Craker	1,814	52.8	
Liberal Democrats	Tracey Neal	1,313	38.2	
Conservative	Grace Elizabeth Woods	181	5.3	
National Front	Jon Mainprize	125	3.6	
Majority		501	14.5	
Turnout		3,454	35.9	
Labour gain from Liberal Democrats		Swing		

=== University ===
University
Party	Candidate	Votes	%	±%
Labour	Joyce Irene Korczak Fields	1,026	49.3	
Liberal Democrats	Christine Elizabeth Randall	679	32.6	
Conservative	Nikki Knowles	143	6.9	
UKIP	Julian Penna	132	6.3	
Green	James Edward Russell	84	4.0	
Independent	Simon Bruce Pickering	17	0.8	
Majority		347	16.6	
Turnout		2,089	28.8	
Labour gain from Liberal Democrats		Swing		
