= Christine Jensen =

Christine Jensen may refer to:

- Christine Bøe Jensen (born 1975), Norwegian footballer
- Christine Jensen Burke (born 1968), New Zealand mountain climber
- Christine Jensen (campaigner) (1939-2001), British fishing industry safety campaigner
- Christine Jensen (musician) (born 1970), Canadian musician
