= Mary Denness =

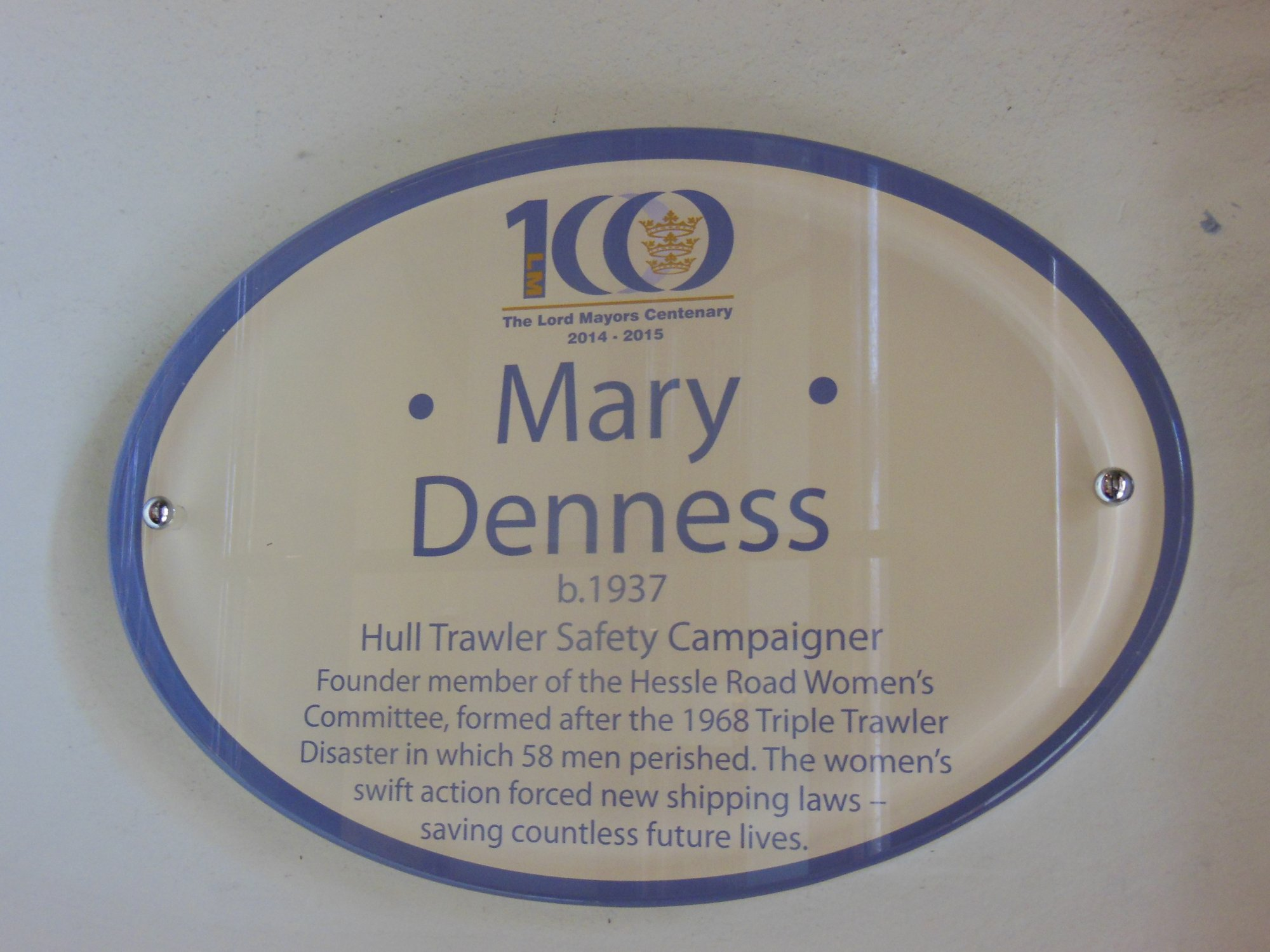
- Plaque in her honour at Hull Maritime Museum
- Born: 1937; Hull, England
- Died: March 2017 (aged 79–80)
- Occupations: Ship's steward, school nurse, matron
- Known for: Safety campaign following the 1968 Hull triple trawler tragedy.

Mary Denness (nee Taylor; 1937 – March 2017) was a British ship's steward and fisherman's wife. She helped to lead a campaign that led to improvements in the safety of fishing trawlers following the 1968 Hull triple trawler tragedy. Denness afterwards served as a school nurse and was a matron at Eton College.

== Early life ==
Mary Taylor was born on the Hessle Road in Hull in 1937. Her family were involved in the fishing industry and as a teenager she worked as a steward on board ships for Thomas Wilson Sons & Co., a job usually then carried out by men. She married Barry Denness, the skipper of a fishing trawler, in the 1950s and they had three children.

== Hull trawler tragedy ==
The city of Hull was hit by the triple trawler tragedy in early 1968. Within two months three trawlers – the St. Romanus, Kingston Peridot, and Ross Cleveland – were lost with 58 of their crew. A campaign was started amongst local fishermen's wives, led by Lillian Bilocca, to improve safety standards aboard the trawlers. Key demands were for all trawlers to have a radio operator on board when they put to sea; for ships to be fully manned; for improved training and safety equipment; for better weather forecasts; and for a dedicated medical vessel to accompany the fleet.

Denness and Bilocca together with Christine Jensen and Yvonne Blenkinsop formed the Hessle Road Women's Committee to co-ordinate the campaign. The group became known as the "headscarf revolutionaries" for their direct-action tactics which included storming the offices of ship owners and preventing ships from leaving the harbour. The women organised a "Fishermen's Charter" petition with more than 10,000 signatures of support, collected within 10 days, which was presented to the British government. Prime Minister Harold Wilson subsequently granted all of the requests and the campaign became known as one of the most successful civil actions of the 20th century.

== Later life ==
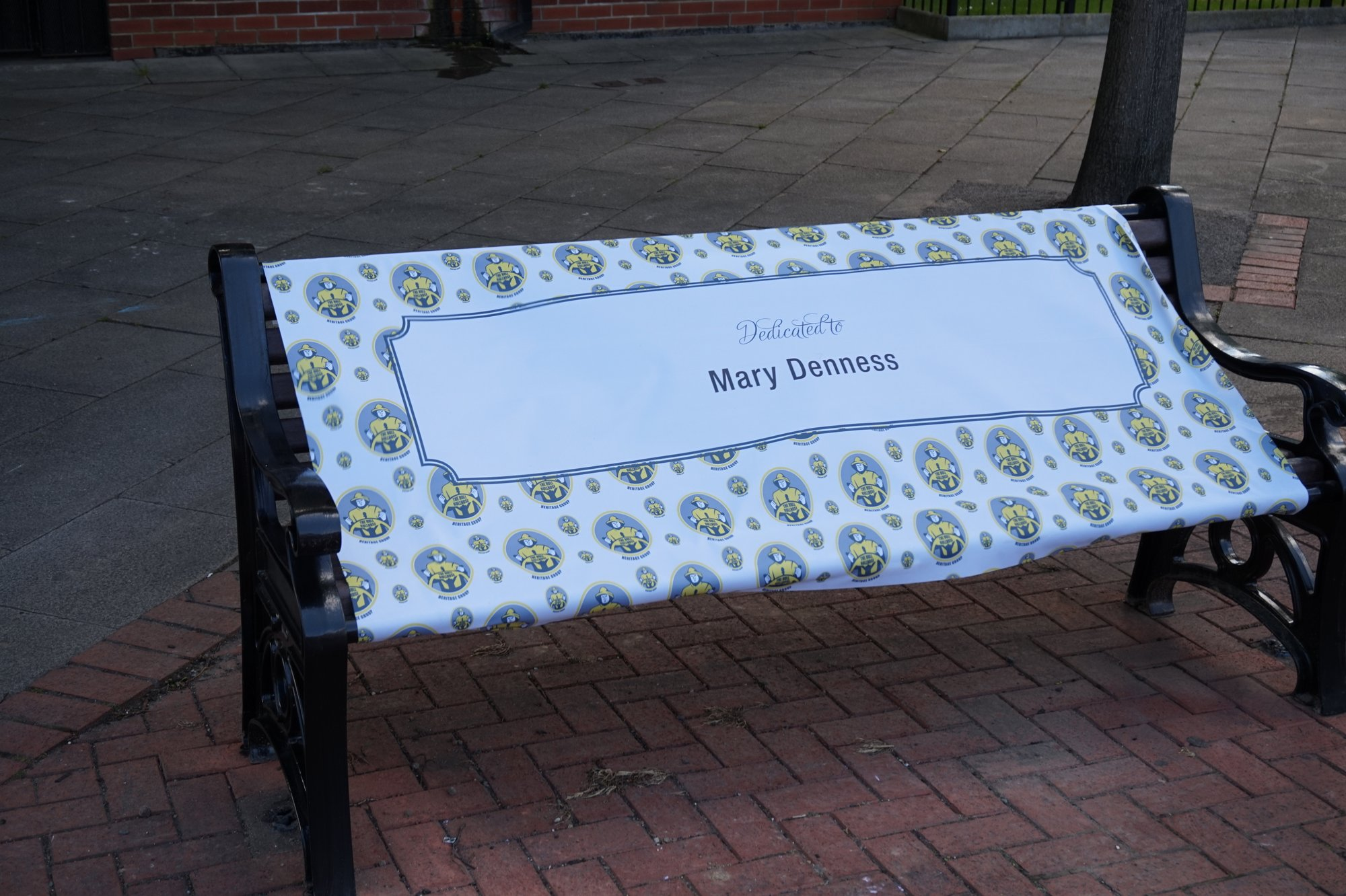
Memorial bench at the corner of Hessle Road and the Boulevard

Denness divorced in the 1970s and became a school nurse. She worked as matron at Eton College during the time when Princes William and Harry attended. After retirement from Eton she moved to Goxhill in Lincolnshire before entering a care home. Denness and Blenkinsop attended the unveiling of plaques to each of the headscarf revolutionaries at the Hull Maritime Museum on 25 May 2015. She died from cancer in March 2017.

Karl Turner MP described her as a "Hull legend". Former Deputy Prime Minister John Prescott said "they do not build them like Mrs Mary Denness anymore. She was a wonderful woman and along with Mrs Bilocca, Mrs Blenkinsop and Mrs Smallbone [Jensen] she changed the most dangerous of industries. All fishermen, indeed all who go to sea, should be grateful for the massive changes they brought that saved thousands of lives to come". Dr Brian Lavery, who wrote a history of the revolutionaries, described her as "a great campaigner but more than that, a great person whose eloquence, elegance, and kindness never failed to impress me". A mural in honour of and depicting the women was unveiled in Hessle Road in October 2017, with the unveiling being attended by Denness' daughter Lorna.
