= Yvonne Blenkinsop =

English fishing safety campaigner (1938–2022)

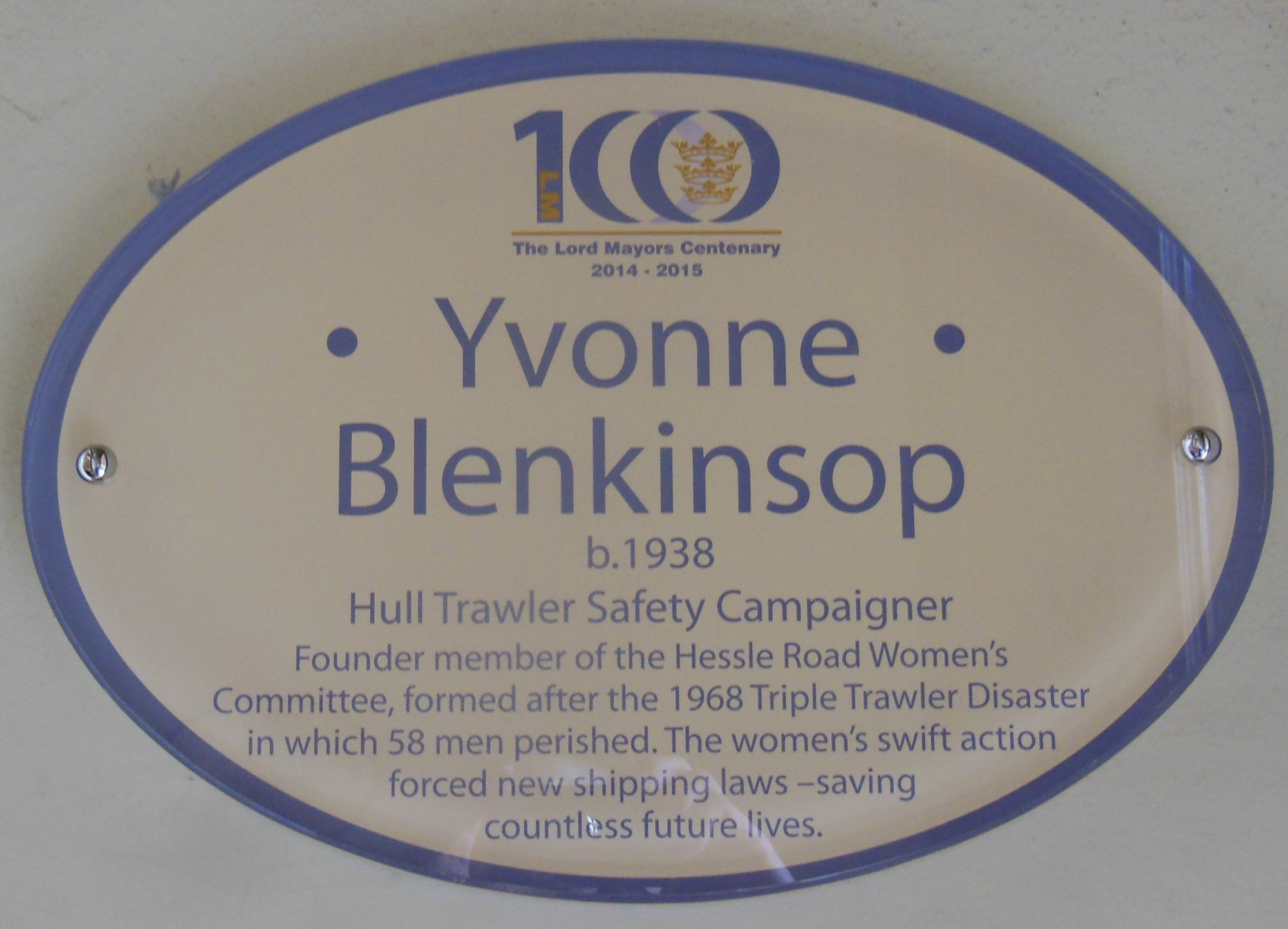
- Plaque in her honour at Hull Maritime Museum
- Born: Yvonne Marie Neilsen; 19 May 1938; Kingston upon Hull, England
- Died: 24 April 2022 (aged 83); Hessle, England
- Known for: Safety campaign following the 1968 Hull triple trawler tragedy.

Yvonne Marie Blenkinsop (née Neilsen; 19 May 1938 – 24 April 2022) was a British woman known for her campaign to improve safety in the offshore fishing industry following the 1968 Hull triple trawler tragedy. In 2018, she became only the third woman in 130 years to be awarded the freedom of the city of Hull.

== Early life ==
Yvonne Marie Neilsen was born in Kingston upon Hull, England on 19 May 1938, and was the oldest of six children. Her father died when she was 16, having had a heart attack whilst at sea on board the fishing trawler Loch Melfort. Blenkinsop subsequently assumed responsibility for looking after the family, her mother being debilitated by a nervous condition caused by the Second World War. Blenkinsop found work as a cabaret singer.

== Hull trawler tragedy ==
Hull was hit by the triple trawler tragedy in early 1968. The fishing trawler St. Romanus was thought lost with all 20 hands on 26 January. Shocked by the loss, that same night, Blenkinsop – who was then 30 years old – wrote down 27 safety measures that she thought would reduce the level of risk in the industry. Four days later, the trawler Kingston Peridot was reported lost with all 20 of her crew. Together with a group of local women – Lillian Bilocca, Mary Denness, and Christine Jensen – Blenkinsop founded the Hessle Road Women's Committee to co-ordinate a campaign to improve safety on the trawlers. The group organised a public meeting at a community hall on 2 February that was attended by more than 300 women, who were concerned anout the safety record of the offshore fishing industry. Blenkinsop spoke on stage at the meeting and just hours later was punched in the face by a man who was angry that she was "interfering in men's business". Three days later, the Ross Cleveland and 18 of her crew were lost at sea.

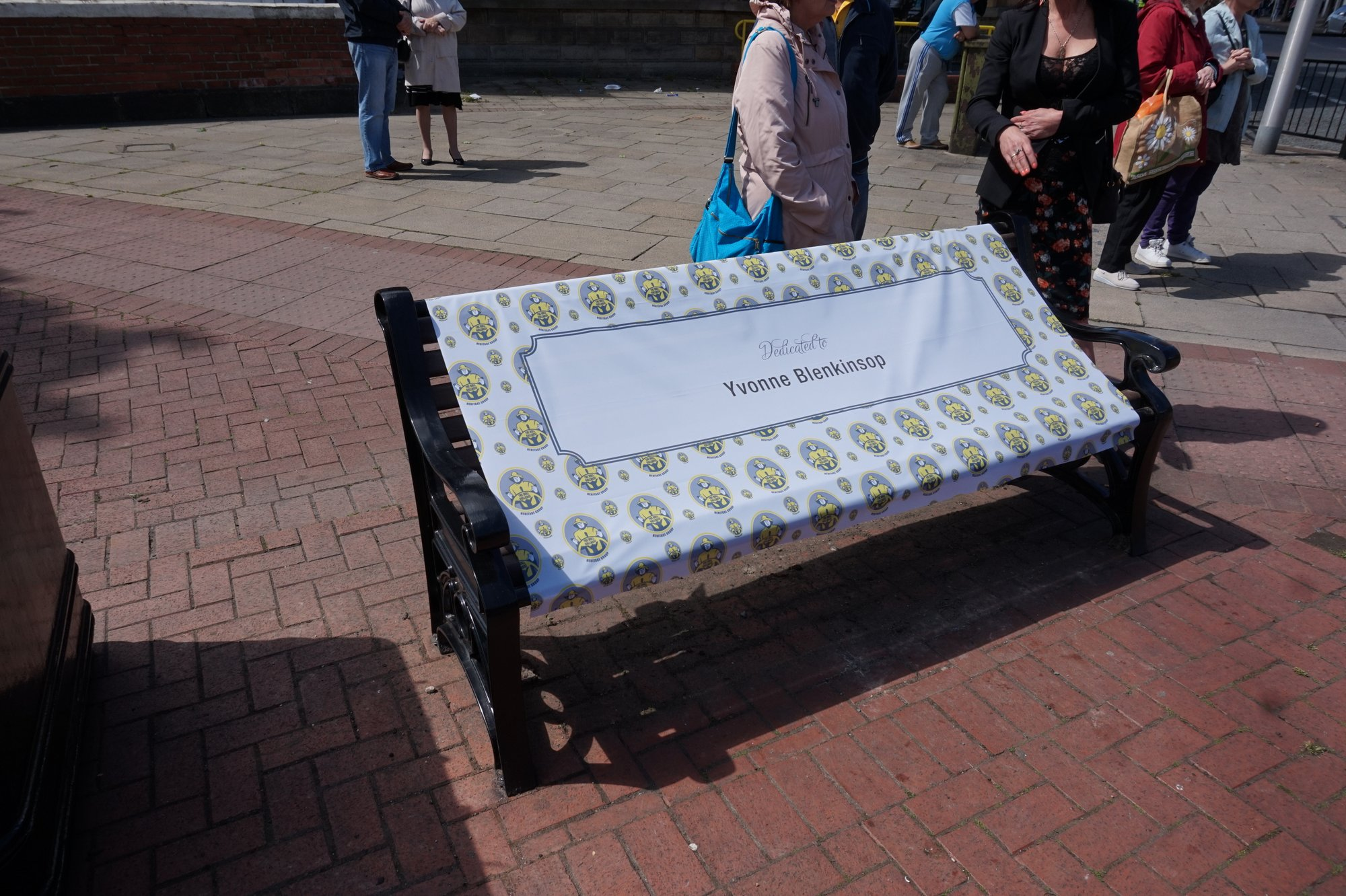
Memorial bench at the corner of Hessle Road and the Boulevard

The women's committee became known as the "headscarf revolutionaries" for their direct-action tactics, which included storming the offices of ship owners and preventing ships from leaving the harbour. They demanded that all trawlers have a radio operator on board when they go to sea; that ships be fully crewed; that improved training and safety equipment be provided; that better weather forecasts be sourced; and that a dedicated medical vessel should accompany the fleet at sea. The women organised a "Fishermen's Charter" petition with more than 10,000 signatures of support, collected within 10 days and presented to the British government. Blenkinsop attended a meeting with Fred Peart, Minister of Agriculture, Fisheries and Food, and J. P. W. Mallalieu, a minister at the Board of Trade, to discuss the matter. Blenkinsop asked Mallalieu, whom she called "petal" (a northern England term of endearment) by mistake, if they would get their safety measures. He replied that they would, and the medical vessel was delivered just weeks later. All remaining requests were subsequently granted, and the campaign became known as one of the most successful civil actions of the 20th century.

== Later life and death ==
Blenkinsop lived in Hessle. Her daughter is a care worker and was present during the death of fellow headscarf revolutionary Mary Denness. In May 2015, Blenkinsop, Denness, Bilocca and Jensen were honoured with plaques at the Hull Maritime Museum. Also in 2015, Blenkinsop attended the launch of Brian Lavery's book The Headscarf Revolutionaries, a history of the 1968 safety campaign. Blenkinsop was consulted by Maxine Peake during her research into the story for a 2017 play she wrote about the campaign. In December 2018, Blenkinsop became only the third woman in more than 130 years to be granted the honorary freedom of the city of Hull.

Blenskinsop died from a pulmonary embolism at a care home in Hessle, on 24 April 2022, aged 83.
