= Reg Meuross =

English folk singer

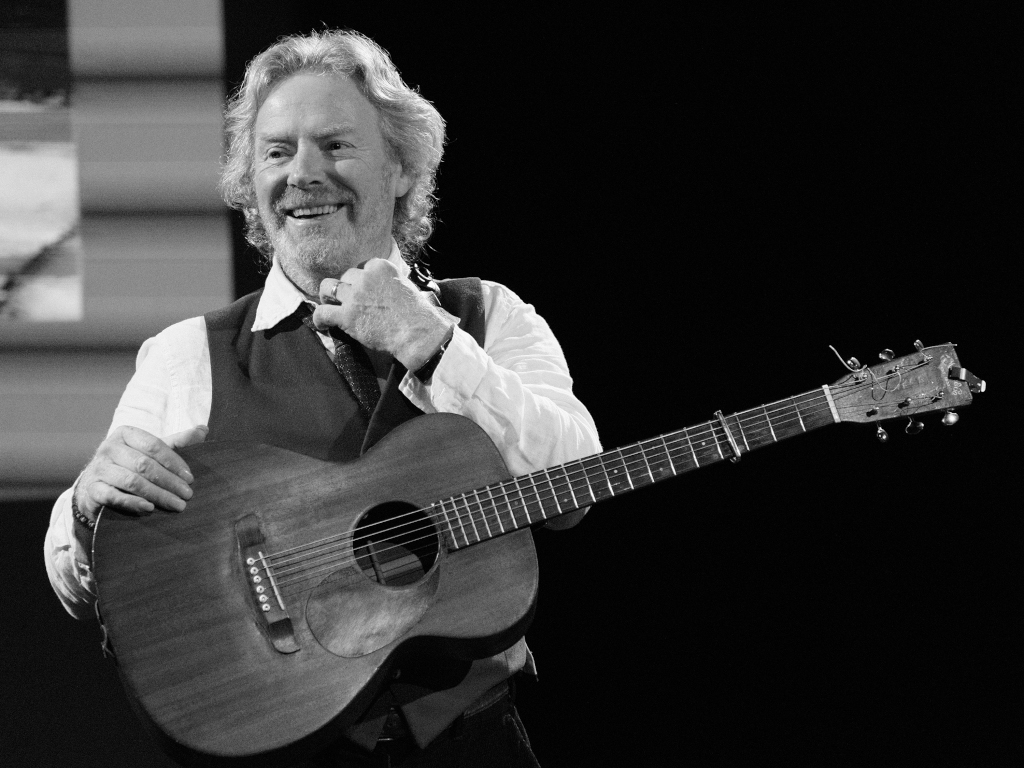
- Reg Meuross at the Cockpit Theatre, London, on 5 October 2019

Background information
- Born: Reginald Lawrence Meuross; 5 January 1953 (age 73); Stockton-on-Tees, England
- Genre: Folk music
- Occupations: Musician, singer-songwriter
- Instruments: Guitar, banjo, dulcimer, voice, harmonica
- Years active: 1986–present
- Labels: Hatsongs, Stockfisch Records
- Website: regmeuross.com

Reg Meuross is an English singer and songwriter based in Somerset. He has released 15 solo albums. His songwriting contains narrative, protest and commentary.

== Career ==
Meuross first appeared on the British acoustic music scene in 1986 when he formed The Panic Brothers with comedian Richard Morton. He made an album called In The Red, produced by Clive Gregson. "The Brothers" appeared regularly on TV, including on Friday Night Live; and at Edinburgh, Sidmouth, Glastonbury and other festivals.

Following his work with The Panic Brothers, Meuross formed a roots band, The Flamingos, featuring former Graham Parker guitarist Martin Belmont, Bob Loveday from the Penguin Café Orchestra and Bob Geldof's band, and Alison Jones of The Barely Works. The Flamingos recorded an album, Arrested, in 1991.

Meuross toured until 2009 with Hank Wangford and The Lost Cowboys as a member of the band, and also as a solo artist with Hank Wangford on the "No Hall Too Small" tour.

Meuross's solo recording and touring career began in 1996. He has released 15 albums as a solo artist. In a review in The Guardian in 2016, Robin Denselow described him as "one of the more versatile, under-sung survivors of the English acoustic scene."

He co-wrote Seth Lakeman's first single, "Divided We Will Fall", from the album The Well Worn Path, released on the Cooking Vinyl label in November 2018.

== Solo albums ==
In 1996 Meuross released his first solo album, The Goodbye Hat. It was followed by Short Stories in 2004, and Still in 2006.

Dragonfly was released in July 2008. One of its songs, "And Jesus Wept", was inspired by the story of Harry Farr, a first World War soldier in the trenches who suffered from shell-shock and was shot for cowardice and desertion. "Lizzie Loved a Highwayman" is the story of highwayman Dick Turpin, told from the third person perspective of his widow. Meuross performed these two songs at the Royal Albert Hall on 25 March, 2009, as part of a concert for the Teenage Cancer Trust. The title track of the album, "Dragonfly", was written about the events of 9/11 and the 7 July bombings in London.

All This Longing (2010) is an all-acoustic album featuring Paul Sartin (Bellowhead), Andy Cutting on accordion, Jackie Oates on viola, Simon Edwards on bass and Roy Dodds (Fairground Attraction) on percussion. The album includes the song "The Heart Of Ann Lee", which told the story of the Manchester-born, 18th century founder of the Shakers, Ann Lee, who was forced into marriage, bore four live children "taken before they were ten" and four stillborn, and fled to the United States to escape persecution.

The Dreamed and the Drowned (2011) is a collection of previously unreleased tracks recorded between 2006 and 2011. The next two albums were Leaves and Feathers (2013) and England Green and England Grey (2014).

December (2016) was the first in a trilogy of albums on which Meuross sang and played all the instruments (guitar, banjo, dulcimer, tenor guitar and harmonica) himself. Martin Chilton of The Telegraph included December in his selection for Best Folk Albums of 2016. Faraway People followed in 2017, with the title track being named "Song of the Year 2017" in Fatea Magazine's annual awards show. The album RAW completed the solo trilogy in November 2019.

A remote collaboration during lockdown led to the in-person recording, with folk duo Harbottle & Jonas, of a collection of traditional folk songs. The result is Songs Of Love & Death (2021).

Three albums are in song cycle format. Twelve Silk Handerchiefs (2018) covers the story of the 1968 Hull triple trawler tragedy in which 58 men died, and the subsequent campaign for improved safety conditions in the fishing industry. Stolen from God (2023), the product of four years of research, examines England's part in the transatlantic slave trade during the 17th and 18th centuries. Fire & Dust: A Woody Guthrie Story (2025) pays homage to the life and work of Woody Guthrie.

== Discography ==
=== Albums ===
- Panic Brothers – In The Red (Special Delivery 1987)
- Reg Meuross with The Flamingos – Arrested (1991)
- Reg Meuross – The Goodbye Hat (1996)
- Reg Meuross – Short Stories (2004)
- Reg Meuross – Still (2006)
- Reg Meuross – Dragonfly (Hatsongs; 2008)
- Reg Meuross – All This Longing (Hatsongs; 2010)
- Reg Meuross – The Dreamed and the Drowned (Hatsongs; 2011)
- Reg Meuross – Leaves & Feathers (Hatsongs; 2013)
- Reg Meuross – England Green & England Grey (Hatsongs; 2014)
- Reg Meuross – December (March 2016)
- Reg Meuross – Faraway People (July 2017)
- Reg Meuross – Songs About A Train (February 2018)
- Reg Meuross – Reg Meuross (April 2018) Released by Stockfisch Records
- Reg Meuross – 12 Silk Handkerchiefs (December 2018)
- Reg Meuross – RAW (October 2019)
- Reg Meuross with Harbottle & Jonas – Songs Of Love & Death (October 2019)
- Reg Meuross – Stolen From God (April 2023)
- Reg Meuross – Fire & Dust (March 2025)

=== Singles ===
- Reg Meuross – "Shine On" (1 May 2020)
- Reg Meuross – "The Bevin Boys (Bill Pettinger's Lament)" (VE Day, 8 May 2021)

== Musical style and subject matter ==
Meuross's work can be described as folk music in the living tradition. He writes about real people and their lives, delivering his songs on stringed instruments – primarily a restored 1944 Martin 017 guitar – that are often played in a fingerpicking style. His subject matter is varied and his repertoire includes songs about historical characters and events, protest songs, political and social commentary, love songs, and flights of imagination inspired by personal experiences.

=== Songs about historical figures and events ===
- "And Jesus Wept" tells the story of British soldier Private Harry Farr, who was posthumously pardoned in 2017, having been executed in 1916 for alleged cowardice during the Battle of the Somme
- "Emily's Pages" is about the 19th century American poet Emily Dickinson
- "For Sophie (This Beautiful Day)" honours the courage of German student Sophie Scholl, who was guillotined by the Nazis for distributing anti-war leaflets
- "Lizzie Loved a Highwayman" unravels the romanticised myths surrounding English highwayman Dick Turpin
- "Martin" recognises the actions of Saint Martin of Tours
- "Mr Rain The Tailor" is a tribute to the courage of PC Bill Barker, who was swept away and drowned while trying to save motorists by directing them off a bridge over the swollen River Derwent during the Cumbrian floods of November 2009
- "Shelley's Heart" is about the life, death and heart of Percy Bysshe Shelley, which was returned to his widow after not burning during his cremation
- "The Angel Maker" tells of English nurse, baby farmer and serial killer Amelia Dyer
- "The Ballad of Flora Sandes" is an interpretation of the life of the only British woman to serve in combat as an enlisted soldier in World War I
- "The Band Played Sweet Marie" is the tale of the violin given to RMS Titanic bandleader Wallace Hartley by his fiancée Maria Robinson, as relayed in her voice
- "The Bevin Boys (Bill Pettinger's Lament)" acknowledges the contribution to the war effort made by the Bevin Boys, whose civil conscription to dangerous work in the mines to boost coal production during World War II was widely misinterpreted as cowardly draft dodging, and only formally recognised by the British government in 1995
- "The Bitter Wind" is the tragic story of the 1892 Peter Tavy murders of Emma Doidge and William Rowe by William Williams, whose attentions had been spurned by Emma
- "The Boundary Stone" relates the heartbreaking story of Emmott Sydall of Eyam and her fiancé Rowland Torre of Stoney Middleton, who were separated when the villagers of Eyam self-quarantined during the 1665-6 outbreak of bubonic plague in Derbyshire
- "The Crossbones Graveyard" reveals some of the horrors concealed in an old, unconsecrated burial ground near Southwark Cathedral in south London, where an estimated 15,000 prostitutes and paupers were buried before it was closed in 1853
- "The Dreamed and the Drowned" relays the tragic tale of Betty Corrigall, who was buried in the 1770s in unconsecrated ground on Hoy in Orkney, having taken her own life to escape the shame of being unmarried and pregnant after being abandoned by her lover, a whaler
- "The Eyes of Ida Lewis" tells about the heroic American lighthouse keeper Idawalley Lewis, from the perspective of an imagined suitor
- "The Heart of Ann Lee" considers the trauma suffered by the founding leader of the Shakers, who despite her aversion to sexual relations was forced to marry by her father, lost all her four children in infancy, and was frequently imprisoned for her religious beliefs and actions before she fled to America to escape the persecution she suffered in England
- "Tony Benn's Tribute to Emily Davison" honours both Davison's having hidden herself in a broom cupboard in the House of Commons on the night of the 1911 census, and Tony Benn's erecting a plaque in the same cupboard to commemorate her actions
- "Victor Jara" remembers the Chilean folk singer and political activist who was imprisoned, tortured and murdered in Chile Stadium by military officers under dictator Augusto Pinochet's regime
- "William Brewster Dreams of America"
- "What Would William Morris Say?" asks the listener to consider what the 19th century poet, textile designer and socialist activist would think of modern-day England

==== Song cycles ====
- Meuross's 2018 album 12 Silk Handkerchiefs comprises a song cycle with narrated interludes, which together encapsulate the history of the 1968 Hull triple trawler tragedy in which 58 men died, and the subsequent campaign led by fishwife Lillian Bilocca for improved safety conditions on trawlers.

Inspired by the book The Headscarf Revolutionaries by Brian W. Lavery, the full song cycle was first performed as a multimedia show in Hull Minster on 8 November 2018, with Lavery narrating, and local Hull musicians Sam Martyn and Mick McGarry completing the musical line-up with Meuross.

- Stolen From God, released in 2023, is a 10-song cycle on England's part in the Transatlantic slave trade during the 17th and 18th centuries. The product of four years of research, the album documents the impact of the trade from various perspectives, including the benefits that accrued to the Crown, the church, and other British institutions.
- Fire & Dust: A Woody Guthrie Story (2025) includes 12 original songs which dramatise various events of Guthrie's life, alongside four covers of some of his best-known songs. Commissioned and produced by Pete Townshend, the album features accompaniment from Townshend and others, including Phil Beer, Geraint Watkins, Marion Fleetwood, Roy Dodds and Beth Porter.

=== Protest and commentary songs ===
- "England Green & England Grey" bemoans greed, corruption and the iniquities of government, and makes an oblique reference to questions that arose around practices at the BBC in the wake of the Jimmy Savile scandal. The melody incorporates elements of the Anglican hymn "All Things Bright and Beautiful".
- "Faraway People" criticises the UK government's allocation of welfare benefits, and pays tribute to those whose deaths can be linked to their inability to access various types of support for reasons such as their deemed fitness for work under a Work Capability Assessment, the withdrawal of housing benefits due to the bedroom tax (a result of the UK government's austerity programme), or not qualifying for a Jobseeker's Allowance. Among those remembered in the song are Stephanie Bottrill and Christelle Pardo and her five-month-old son.
- "The Lonesome Death of Michael Brown" speaks out against police brutality after the 2014 fatal shooting of 18-year-old Michael Brown Jr. by Ferguson police officer Darren Wilson. The title of the song is a nod to Bob Dylan's "The Lonesome Death of Hattie Carroll", which itself is a commentary on racism in 1960s America, being about the death in Baltimore of a bartender at the hands of a drunk patron, who struck her with a cane causing her to die of a brain haemorrhage.
