= Made in Hull =

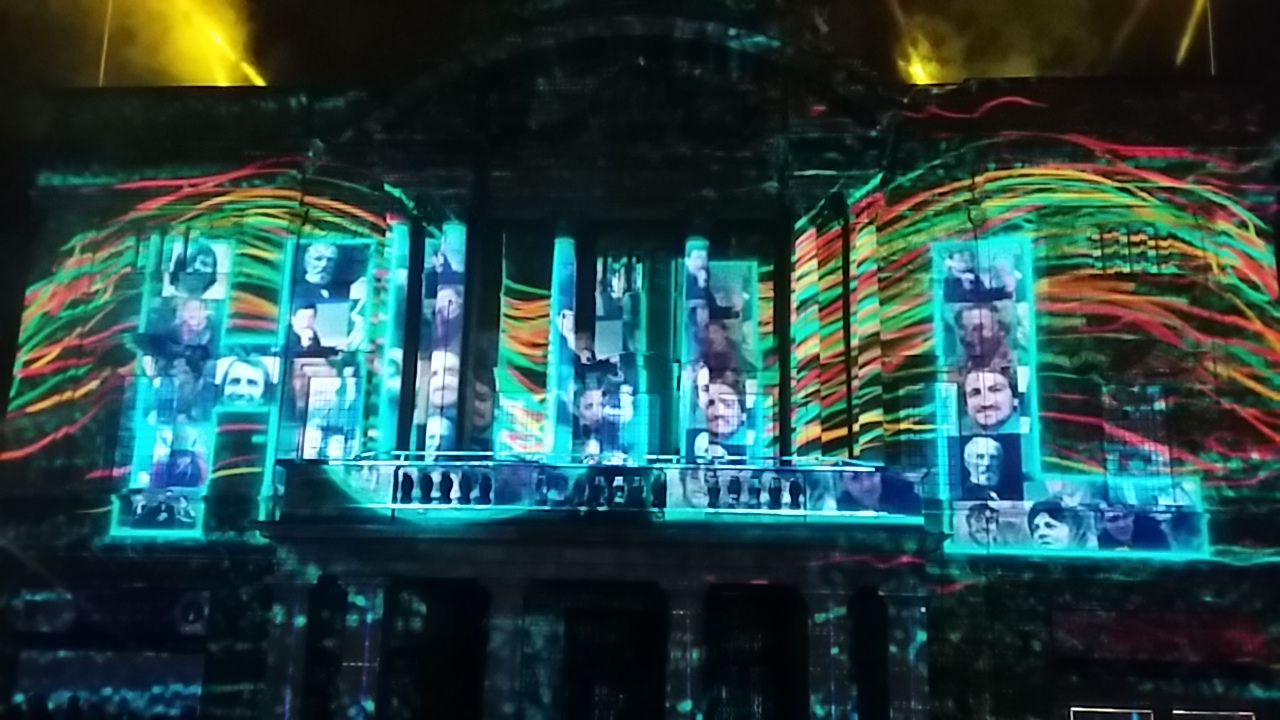
Hull City Hall illuminated at the opening event for Hull City of Culture 2017

Hull Maritime Museum illuminated at the opening event for Hull City of Culture 2017

Made in Hull was the opening season of Hull UK City of Culture 2017 and began with an opening event which ran from 1–7 January 2017. The opening event was devised by creative director Sean McAllister and writer Rupert Creed. It consisted of installations in eight locations across the city of Hull and marked the beginning of the city's period as UK City of Culture, a four-yearly event. By the end of the opening event on 7 January, over 300,000 people were reported to have visited the event and positive reactions were reported in national and local media.

== Locations during the opening event ==
The headline location was a multimedia sound and light installation in Hull's Queen Victoria Square, entitled We Are Hull and devised by Zsolt Balogh with a soundtrack by Dan Jones.

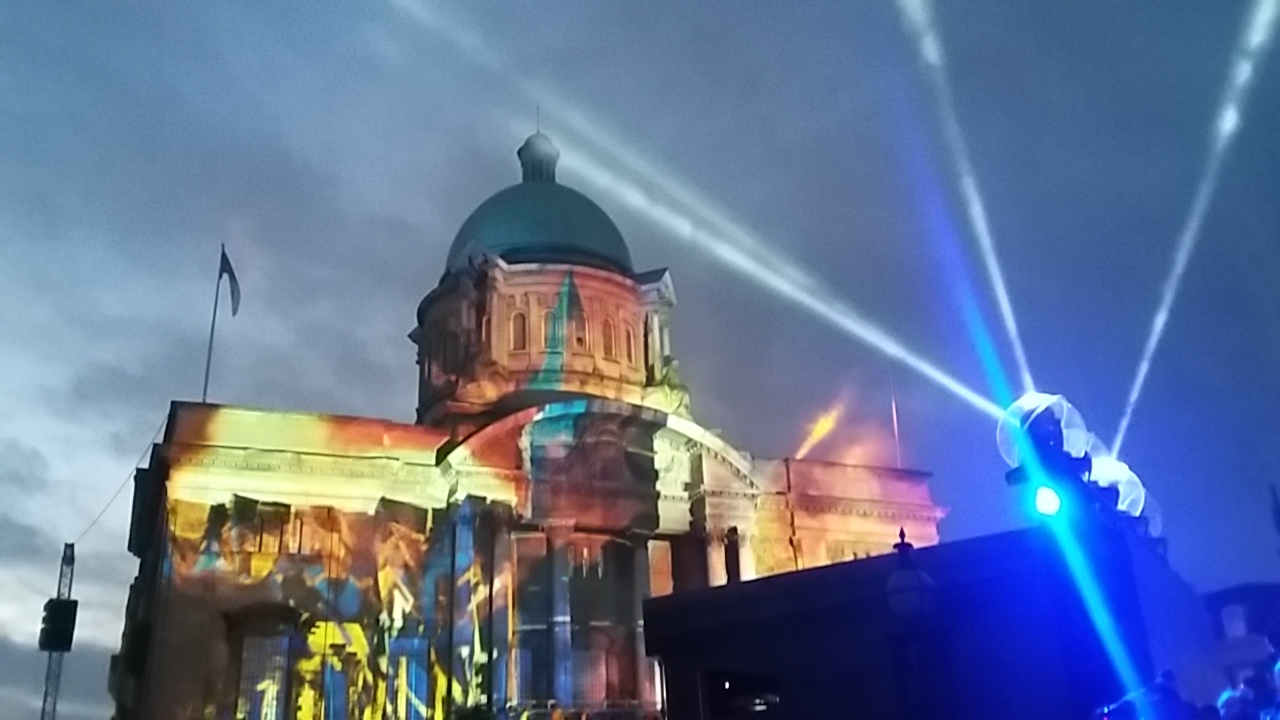
Part of the We Are Hull installation projected onto Hull City Hall

- On Whitefriargate, a main shopping street running from Queen Victoria Square, were a number of shop window installations including a recreation of a family caravan holiday, a recreation of a well known second hand and gift shop from the city, and a fake news agents - the Amuse Agents - assembled by Preston Likely and featuring adverts and flyers for fake events with many in-jokes for Hull residents.
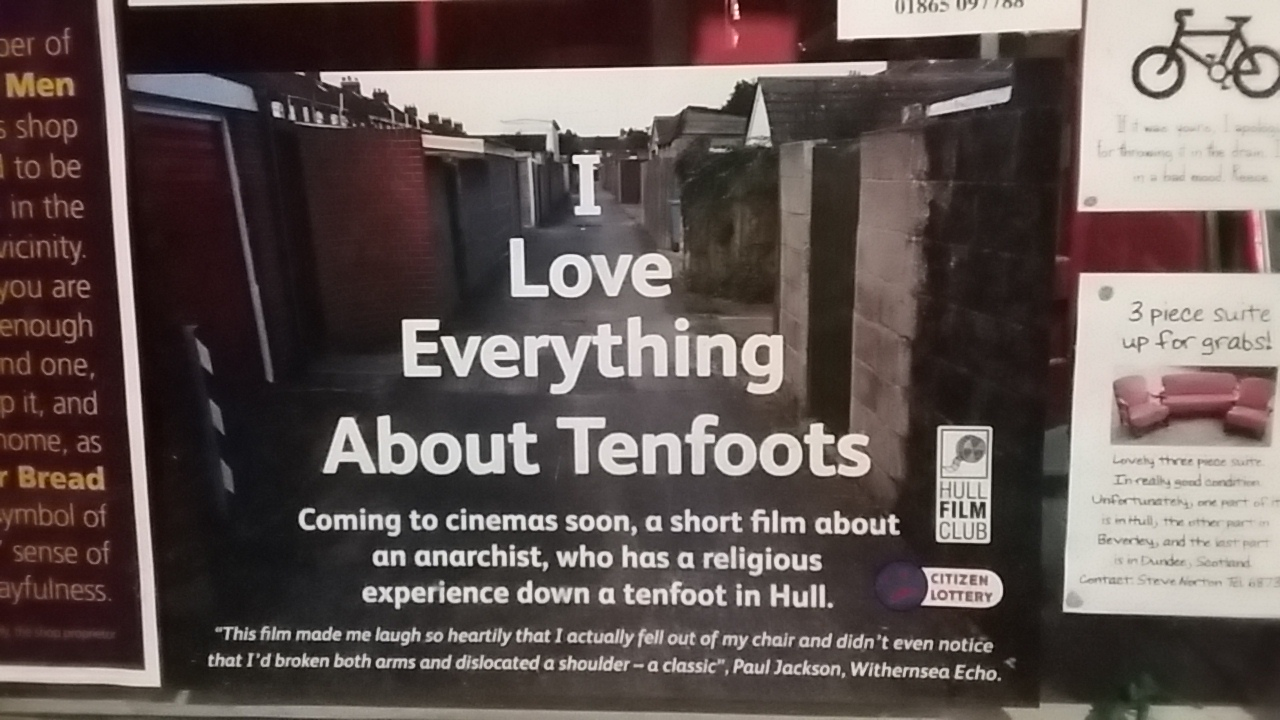
  A spoof advertisement from the Amuse Agents installation
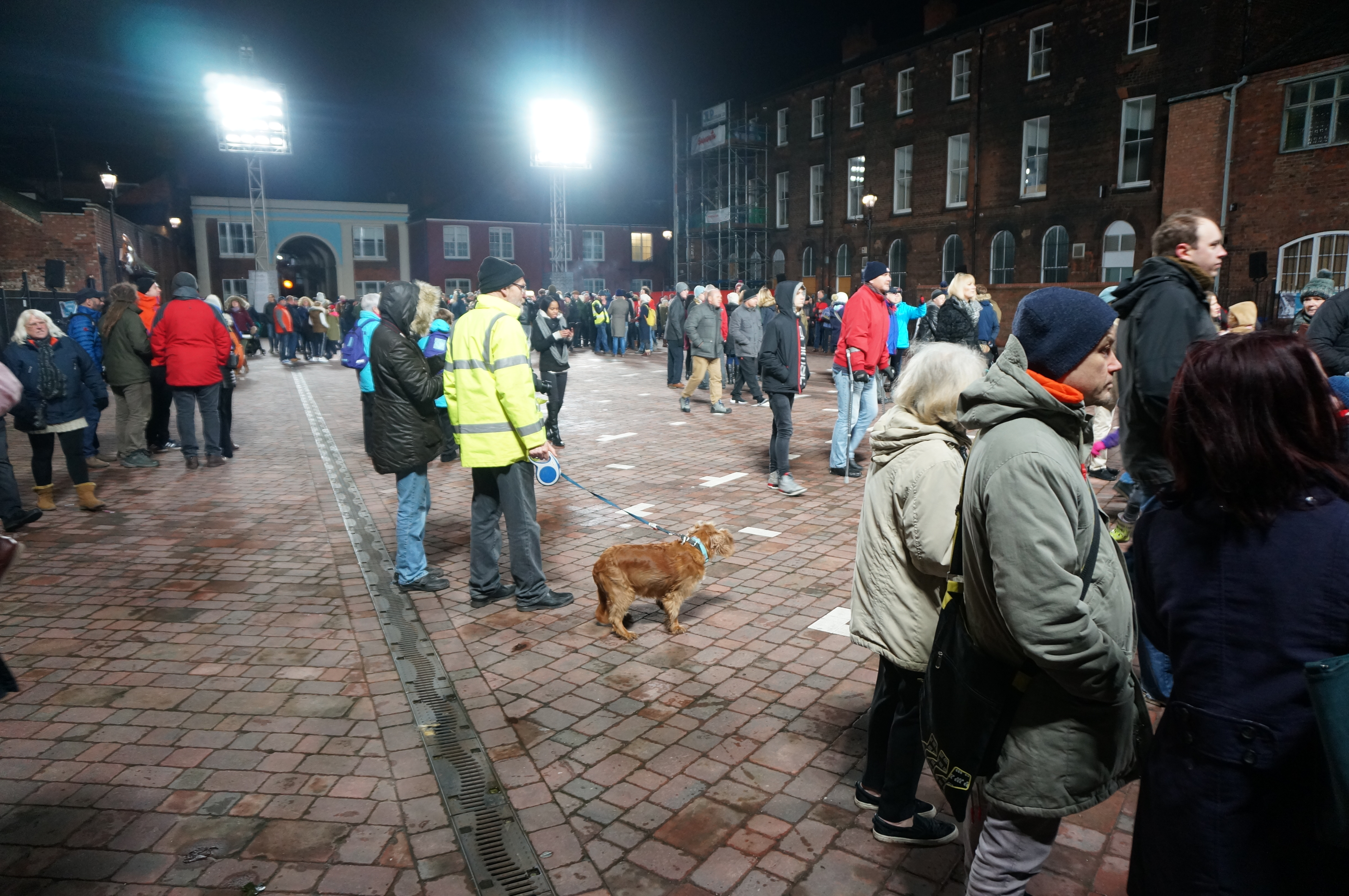
- Zebedee's Yard, where Invisible Flock staged their sound installation
  In Zebedee's Yard a sound installation by Invisible Flock recreated the roar from the crowd at a Hull City football match at full volume under floodlights.
- In the Fruit Market an installation called Hullywood Icons featured residents of Hull photographed as actors in famous scenes from film.
- On Scale Lane a collaboration named MakeAMPLIFY displayed (in) Dignity of Labour, an installation reflecting on unemployment, sanctions and the benefits system from young people in Hull.
- At the High Street underpass below the A63 dual carriageway Jesse Kanda displayed a multi-screen and sound installation called Embers recreating the club music scene of 1990s Yorkshire.
- Arrivals and Departures was projected onto The Deep. Using stop-frame animation, image and sound the story of people arriving from all over the world was projected onto the iconic aquarium, with a soundtrack by Terry Dunn.
- On Humber Street, Urban Projections' playful Vantage Point allowed visitors to take part in the installation and see themselves projected large scale.

=== Opening event production team ===
The production team for the opening event consisted of:

- Creative Director: Sean McAllister
- Writer: Rupert Creed
- Production Designer: Ala Lloyd
- Lighting Designer: Durham Marenghi
- Sound Designer: Dan Jones
- Lead Producer: Niccy Halifax

== Blade ==
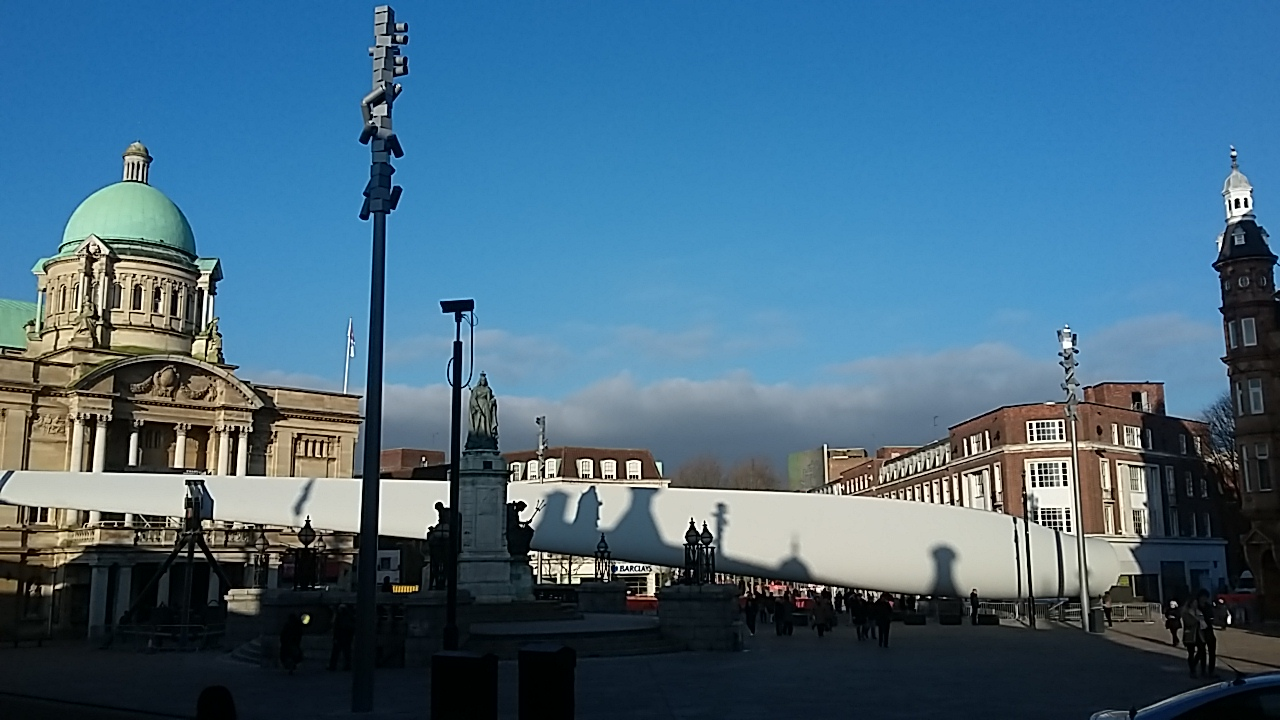
The Blade installation as part of Hull UK City of Culture 2017.

On 8 January 2017, a 250-foot (76 m) rotor-bade was installed in Queen Victoria Square as part of the Look Up series of installations. The blade was manufactured by Siemens at its factory on Alexandra Dock, Hull and was in place until 18 March. The installation, known as Blade, was not announced in the programme and was a surprise to the general public until the small hours of Sunday 8 January, when the giant artefact was slowly driven through the centre of the city and put in place. In an installation devised by artist Nayan Kulkarni, the blade is set at an angle so that the tip is 5.5 metres (18 ft) above the ground, allowing double decker buses to pass underneath. The installation was the first in a series to be known as Look Up, a programme of temporary artworks created for the city’s public spaces and places. After the blade was installed in Victoria Square it was discovered that there was no planning permission for the structure, required because it was to be in place for more than 28 days. City of Culture chief executive Martin Green said that because the installation was a surprise it had been agreed that planning permission would be sought retrospectively.

== Bowhead ==
Throughout the initial three-month season, Hull Maritime Museum displayed a multimedia installation depicting a Bowhead whale (otherwise known as a Greenland Right Whale). The installation was designed by students from Hull School of Art and Design with music by students from Hull University. The installation brought visitors face to face with a digitally rendered whale as if they were looking through the screens of the exhibit into the whales' habitat. Whaling was once an important part of the economy of Hull, and this event was a nod towards that heritage.

== The City Speaks ==
This is an interactive light artwork that is installed on the River Hull tidal barrier. Members of the public speak into a microphone and their words are transcribed onto the west tower of the barrier.

== Creative Communities Programme ==
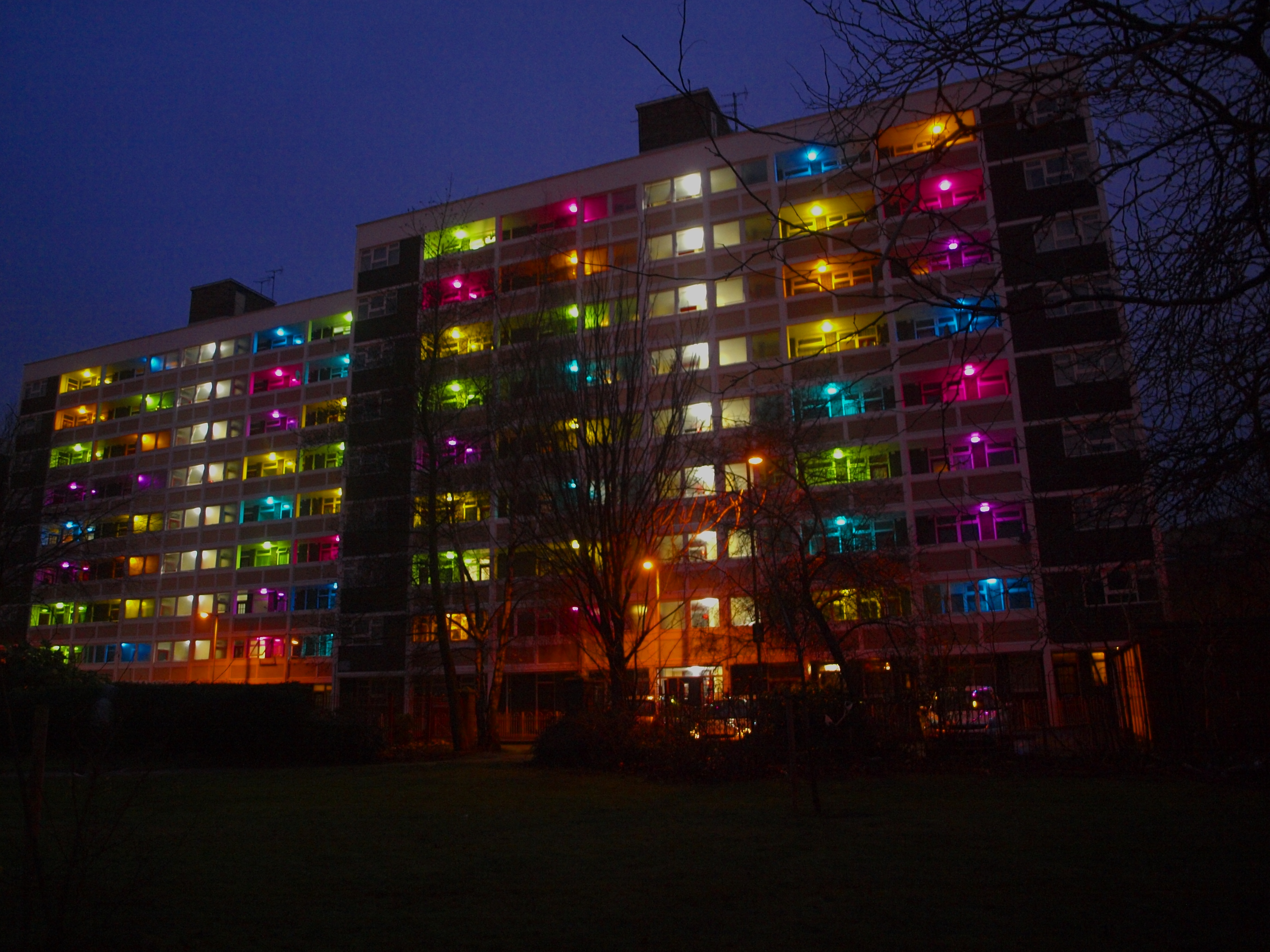
Melville Street flats illuminated for I Wish To Communicate With You

As well as the many projects commissioned from professional artists, the whole City of Culture year supported sixty community projects encouraging local people and groups to develop their own events and work. During the first season one of the most dramatic was an installation called I wish to communicate with you which simply placed coloured filters into the lights of blocks of flats, transforming them into a large scale light installation.

== Weeping Window ==
The second temporary installation in Queen Victoria Square is Weeping Window a sculpture featuring thousands of ceramic poppies cascading from a window of the Maritime Museum. It commemorates those who died in the First World War and especially those in the Merchant Navy and Royal Navy. The artist was Paul Cummins, designed by Tom Piper, and was officially opened on 25 March 2017. The installation is part of the Blood Swept Lands and Seas of Red on display at The Tower of London in 2014.

== Press coverage ==
By the end of the opening event on 7 January, over 300,000 people were reported to have visited the event and positive reactions were reported in national and local media.

The day after the opening, some tabloid newspapers chose to focus on isolated examples of bad behaviour seen by their reporters, instead of on the actual launch event. These reports led to a swift rebuttal by local sources, including the police commander who reported that there had been no arrests, injuries or serious incidents.
