= Christine Jensen (campaigner) =

British safety campaigner

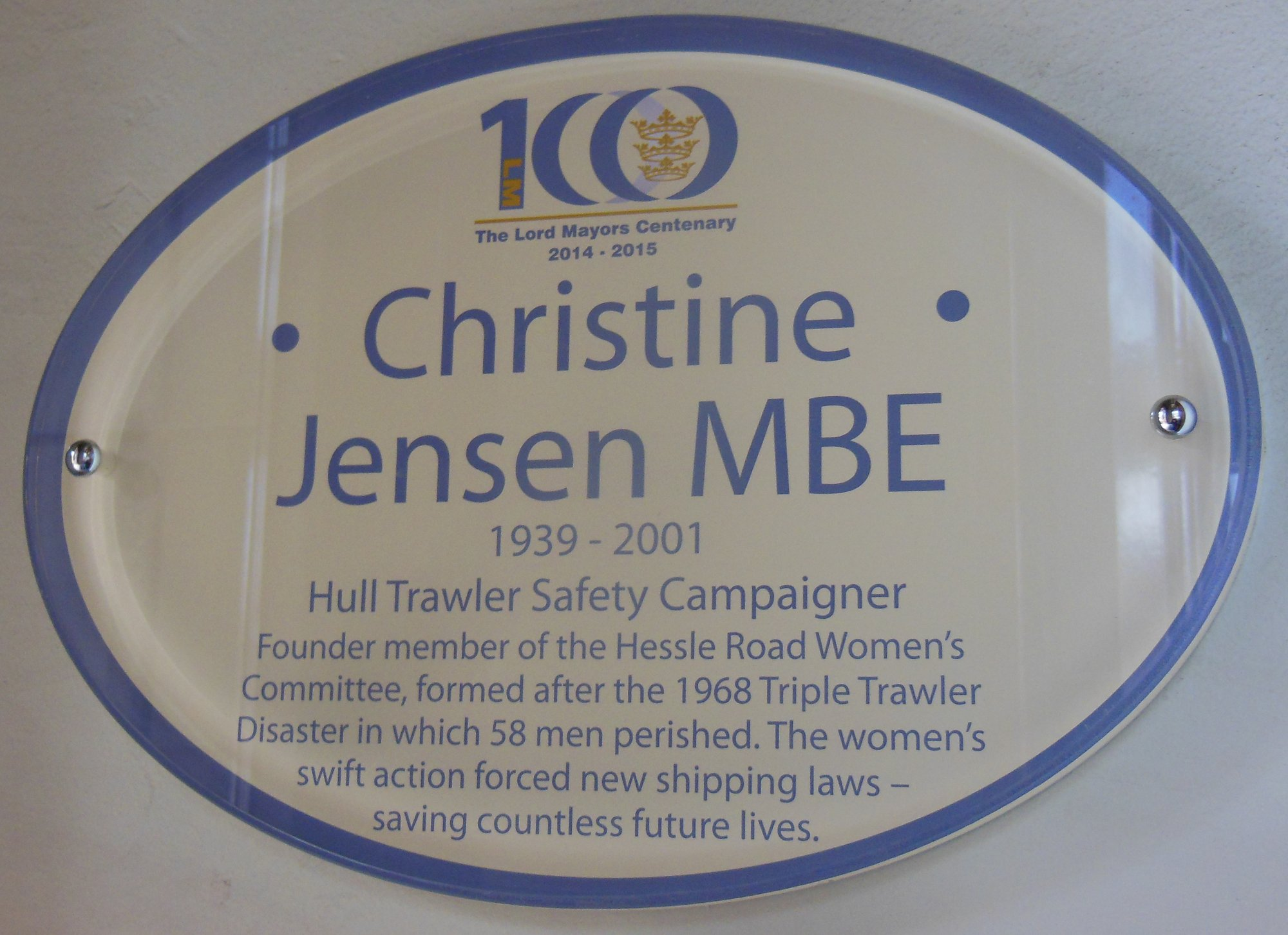
- Plaque in her honour at Hull Maritime Museum
- Born: 1939
- Died: 2001 (aged 61–62)
- Known for: Safety campaign following the 1968 Hull triple trawler tragedy.

Christine Dorothy Jensen, MBE (1939–2001) was a British safety campaigner. She helped to lead a campaign that led to improvements in the safety of fishing trawlers following the 1968 Hull triple trawler tragedy, in which her brother was killed. Jensen later served on the committee of the British Fishermen's Association and founded a fishing heritage organisation. She was appointed a Member of the Order of the British Empire in 2000.

== Hull trawler tragedy ==
Christine Jensen (née Gay and formerly Smallbone) was born in 1939 and lived in Hull. The city was hit by the triple trawler tragedy in early 1968. The fishing trawler St. Romanus was thought lost with all 20 hands on 26 January and the Kingston Peridot was reported lost with all 20 of her crew on 30 January. Together with a group of local women – Lillian Bilocca, Mary Denness and Yvonne Blenkinsop – Jensen founded the Hessle Road Women's Committee to co-ordinate a campaign to improve safety on the trawlers. They demanded that all trawlers should have a radio operator on board when they put to sea; that ships be fully manned; that improved training and safety equipment be provided; that better weather forecasts be sourced; and that a dedicated medical vessel should accompany the fleet at sea.

Jensen arranged a public meeting at a community hall on 2 February that was attended by more than 300 local women, who shared the committee's concerns. Later that same day she met with Harold Wilson to discuss the matter. Jensen however missed a subsequent meeting with Fred Peart, Minister of Agriculture, Fisheries and Food and J. P. W. Mallalieu, a minister at the Board of Trade. This was because she had just learnt of the death of her older brother, Phil Gay, who was skipper of the Ross Cleveland which sank at sea leading to the deaths of 18 of its crew. Gay's last words by radio were: "I am going over. We are laying over. Help me. I'm going over. Give my love and the crew's love to the wives and families". She lost a nephew on another trawler.

The women's committee became known as the "headscarf revolutionaries" for their direct-action tactics which included storming the offices of ship owners and preventing ships from leaving the harbour. The women organised a "Fishermen's Charter" petition with more than 10,000 signatures of support, collected within 10 days, which was presented to the British government. Jensen said at the time: "there seems to be a couldn't-care-less attitude among trawler owners about safety conditions. we intend to shake them up. Our campaign has become the rallying point for discontent over safety and working conditions which has been boiling up among trawler folk for 18 months". Prime Minister Harold Wilson subsequently granted all of the requests and the campaign became known as one of the most successful civil actions of the 20th century.

== Later life ==
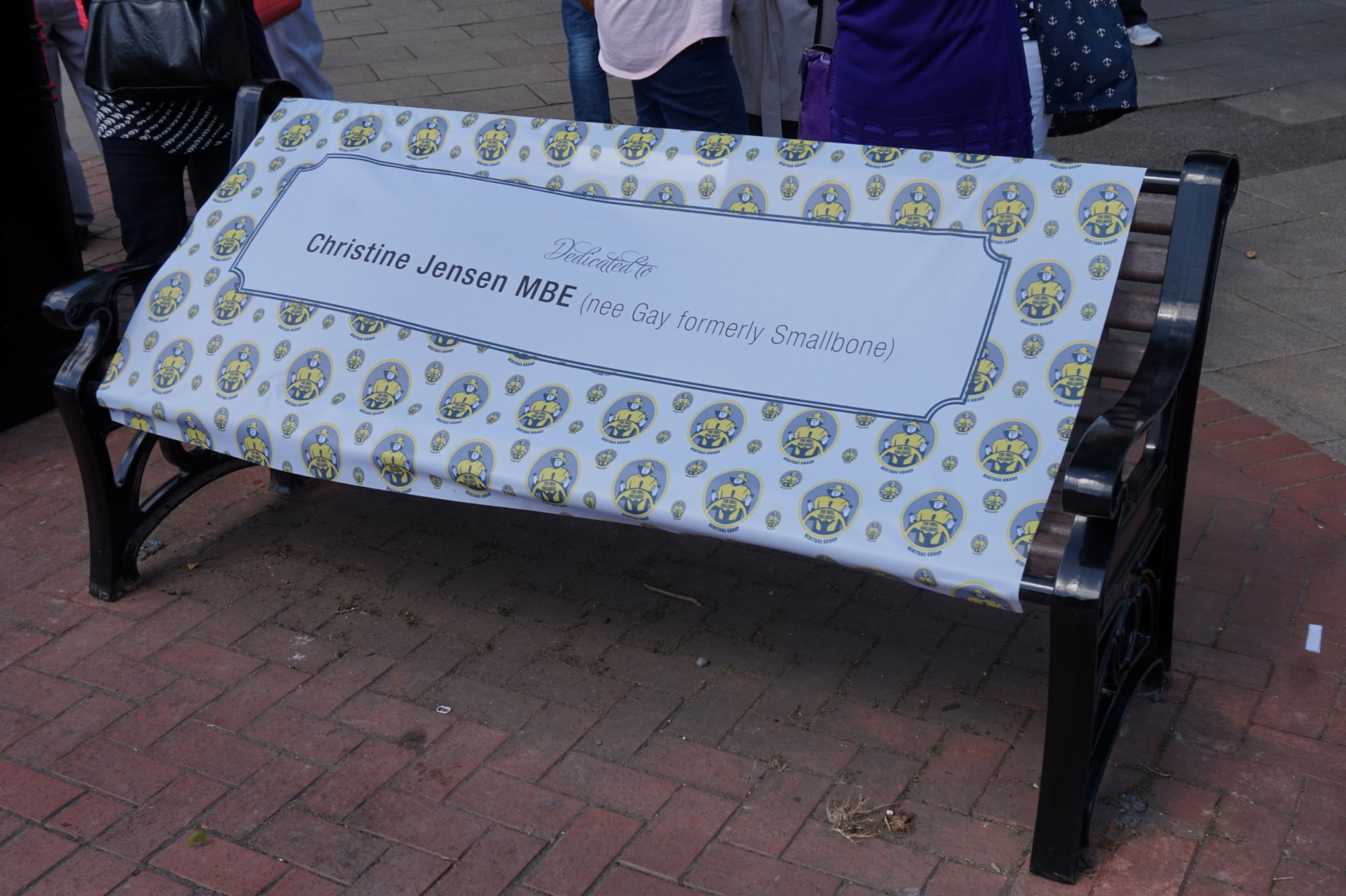
Bench dedicated to Jensen on the Hessle Road

Jensen later served on the committee of the British Fishermen's Association. She campaigned for redundancy pay for trawlermen who had previously been paid by the Ministry of Defence for reporting sightings of Russian warships. She met with Labour politician Alan Johnson to discuss the campaign which was eventually successful, though not until after her death. Jensen was also a proponent of union membership and campaigned for universal membership amongst trawlermen. She founded the organisation Stand to help preserve fishing heritage.

Jensen became the only former headscarf revolutionary to be awarded a British honour when she was appointed a Member of the Order of the British Empire in the 2000 New Year Honours for "services to trawler safety and to the community in Hull". When a community theatre put on a play about the triple trawler tragedy that featured the death of her brother, Jensen acted as an adviser. She died in 2001.

In May 2015, the four lead headscarf revolutionaries, including Jensen, were honoured with plaques at the Hull Maritime Museum. She was depicted in a mural on Hull's Hessle Road in October 2017.
