= Lillian Bilocca =

British fisheries worker and campaigner

- Born: Lillian Marshall; 26 May 1929; Hull, East Riding of Yorkshire, England
- Died: 3 August 1988 (aged 59)
- Other name: "Big Lil"
- Known for: Improving safety in the fishing industry

Lillian Bilocca (née Marshall; 26 May 1929 – 3 August 1988) was a British fisheries worker and campaigner for improved safety in the fishing fleet as leader of the "headscarf revolutionaries" – a group of fishermen's family members. Spurred into action by the Hull triple trawler tragedy of 1968 which claimed 58 lives, she led a direct action campaign to prevent undermanned trawlers from putting to sea and gathered 10,000 signatures for a petition (the Fishermen's Charter) to Harold Wilson's government to strengthen safety legislation. She threatened to picket Wilson's house if he did not take action. Government ministers later implemented all of the measures outlined in the charter.

== Early life ==
Lillian Marshall was born in 7 Welton Terrace, Wassand Street, Hessle Road, Hull on 26 May 1929 to Ernest Marshall, trawlerman and former Royal Navy engineer, and his wife, Harriet, née Chapman. She left the Daltry Street Junior School, Hull at the age of 14 and worked as a cod skinner. She married Carmelo [Charlie] Bilocca (1902–1981), a Maltese sailor who worked with the Hull-based Ellerman-Wilson Line, and later as a trawlerman. They had two children – Ernest (b. 1946) and Virginia (b. 1950). The family lived in a terraced house in Coltman Street, Hull.

Lillian Bilocca had three sisters. Her father, husband and son all worked at sea on the Hull fishing trawlers and Bilocca worked at an on-shore fish factory, filleting the catch. She became known as "Big Lil".

== Headscarf Revolutionaries trawler safety campaign ==
During January and February 1968, the city was hit by the Hull triple trawler tragedy. On around 11 January, the trawler St Romanus was lost with all 20 hands in heavy winds; no knowledge was received of her loss and a search was not begun until 26 January. The Kingston Peridot was subsequently lost – probably on the night of 26/27 January – in icy winds and was reported as probably lost with all 20 hands on 30 January. Upon hearing of the loss of the second vessel, Bilocca is said to have exclaimed to her daughter that "enough is enough" and resolved to take action. A third vessel, the Ross Cleveland was lost on 4 February 1968 with the loss of all bar one of her 19-man crew. The last message received by radio from her skipper, Phil Gay was "I am going over. We are laying over. Help me. I'm going over. Give my love and the crew's love to the wives and families". Ernie [Ernest] Bilocca saw the Ross Cleveland sink from the Kingston Andalusite on which he was a deckhand.

Bilocca and other fishermen's wives were incensed by the continuing loss of men in what was the world's most dangerous industry. One of their complaints was that not all trawlers had a radio operator on board, and that this should be a legal requirement. Bilocca initially attempted to prevent what she considered to be under-manned trawlers from putting to sea from Hull's St Andrew's Dock and had to be restrained by four policemen and policewomen to prevent her from doing so.

With Christine Jensen, Mary Denness and Yvonne Blenkinsop, Bilocca formed the Hessle Road Women's Committee at a meeting of concerned family members which ended with hundreds of women, led by Bilocca, storming the offices of trawler owners. The group was also dubbed as the "headscarf revolutionaries" by the media. Their demands were for full crewing of ships, radio operators to be on board every ship, improved weather forecasts, better training for trainee crew, more safety equipment and a "mother ship" with medical facilities to accompany the fleet. The women gathered 10,000 signatures within 10 days in support of their aims in what they called a "Fishermen's Charter".

Demands to Harold Wilson

If I don't get satisfaction I'll be at that Wilson's house, private house, until I do get satisfaction in some shape or form.

— Lillian Bilocca

Bilocca led a delegation of the "headscarf revolutionaries" to present the charter to the government. Bilocca threatened to picket Prime Minister Harold Wilson's private residence if her demands were not met. She was granted a meeting with Wilson: subsequently, government ministers granted all of their requests. The result was described as one of the biggest and most successful civil actions of the 20th century and Denness stated at the time that "we have achieved more in six weeks than the politicians and trade unions have in years". The action made the headlines of British national newspapers, pushing the Vietnam War off the front page.

Bilocca received death threats from some of the trawler owners and telegrams telling her not to interfere in men's work. She lost her job with a Wassand Street fish merchant in 1968 for having taken three weeks off, without leave, for the campaign. She was blacklisted from working on the docks and never worked in the fishing industry again. It took her two years to find work, and then it was only menial. Carmelo ('Charlie') Bilocca died in 1981 and Lillian moved to the Thornton Estate. In 1985, she married Anthony Colby Ashton (b. 1944), a paint sprayer. She died of peritoneal cancer aged 59 on 3 August 1988.

== Legacy ==
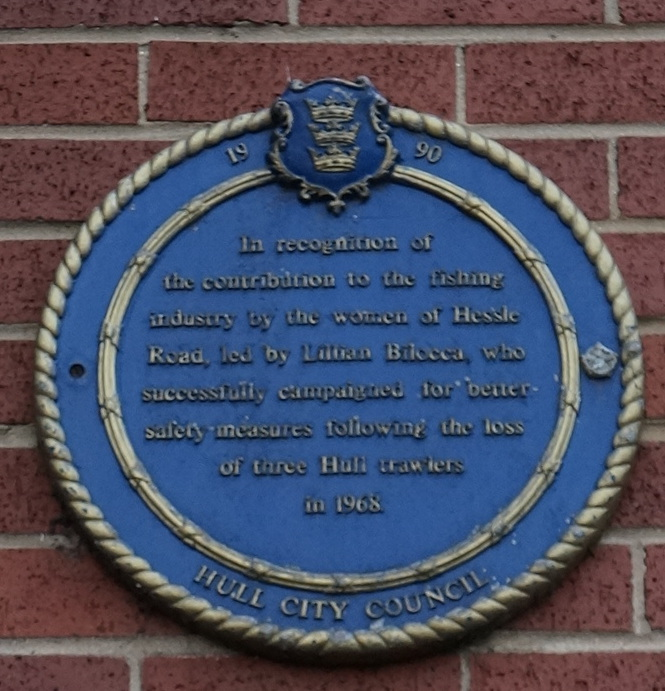
Hull City Council blue plaque in Hessle Road

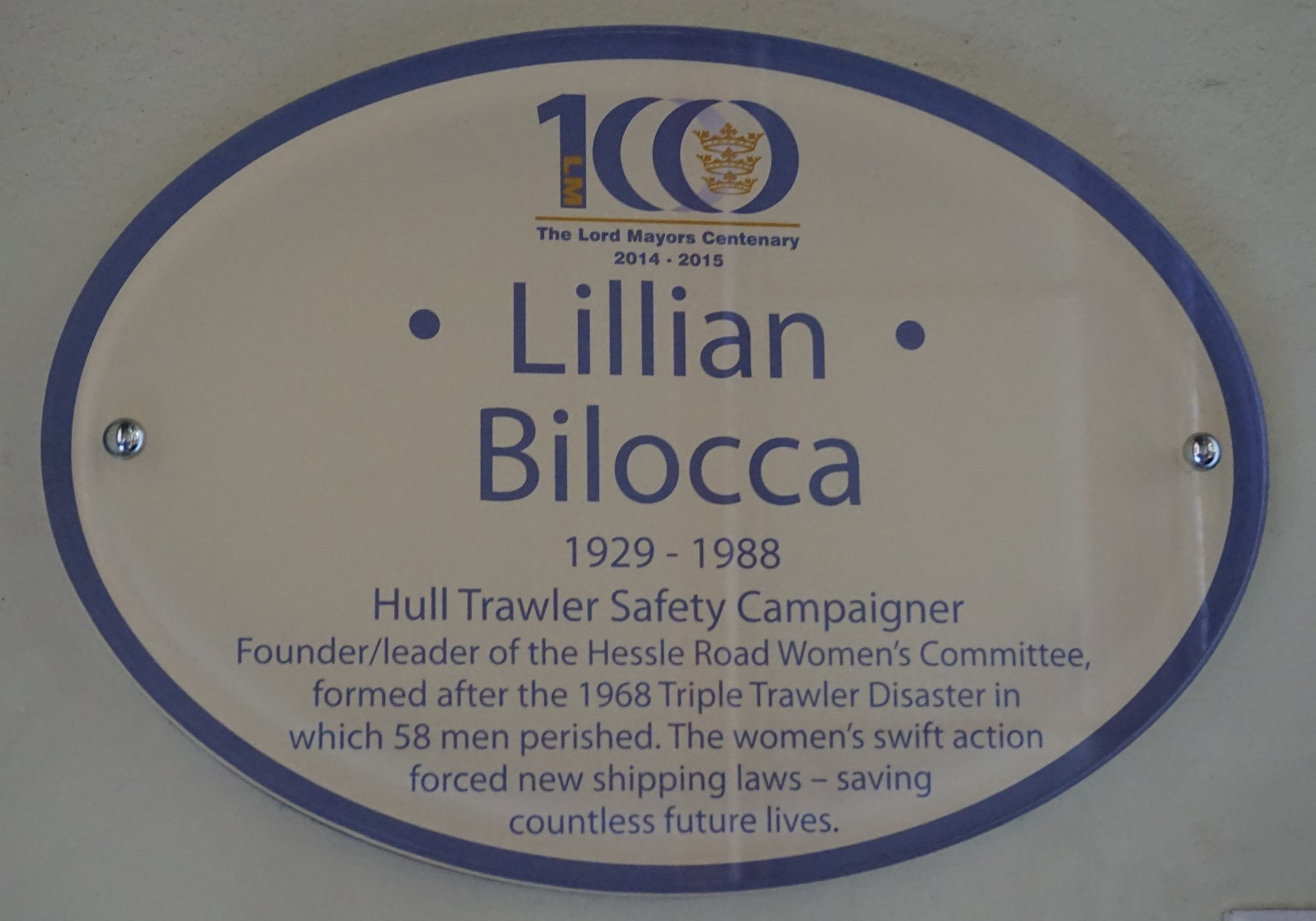
Lord Mayor's centenary plaque at Hull Maritime Museum

Bilocca has been described as a national figure and a local folk hero. She was commemorated by a Hull City Council plaque in Hessle Road in 1990 that reads "In recognition of the contributions to the fishing industry by the women of Hessle Road, led by Lillian Bilocca, who successfully campaigned for better safety measures following the loss of three Hull trawlers in 1968"; another plaque in her honour is at the Hull Maritime Museum. A mural on Hull's Anlaby Road painted by Mark Ervine and Kev Largey depicts Bilocca and her connections with the "headscarf revolutionaries" and the triple trawler tragedy.

Lillian Bilocca mural on Pease Street, Hull

Her story has been told in Rupert Creed's 1998 book Turning the Tide: The 1968 Trawler Tragedy and the Wives' Campaign for Safety, based on interviews with the campaigning women, which was previously broadcast as a radio documentary in 1994 by BBC Radio 4. 'Turning the Tide' was also produced as a multi-media theatre production written and directed by Rupert Creed with songs by Hissyfit and performed at Hull Truck Theatre various times between 2014 and 2018. Lil Bilocca's story has also been told in Amnesty International's 2014 book Not Just Wilberforce: Champions of Human Rights in Hull and East Yorkshire and a 2015 book The Headscarf Revolutionaries: Lillian Bilocca and the Hull Triple-Trawler Disaster by Brian W. Lavery.

Plate commemorating the women of Hessle Road, including Bilocca, on display at Hull Maritime Museum

Lavery's book in turn inspired singer-songwriter Reg Meuross to write a song cycle titled 12 Silk Handkerchiefs, released as an album in December 2018. The song cycle was performed as a multimedia show in Hull Minster for the first time on 8 November 2018, in collaboration with local musicians Sam Martyn and Mick McGarry, with Lavery narrating and presenting a slideshow of seldom-seen images.

Maxine Peake has written a play entitled The Last Testament of Lillian Bilocca, which opened in Hull in November 2017. An earlier play by Val Holmes, who grew up in Hull at the time of the tragedy, was entitled Lil. The Red Production Company is working on a TV drama adaptation of Lil's actions during and after the tragedy.

The BBC broadcast a documentary entitled "Hull's Headscarf Heroes" in February 2018, to mark fifty years since the loss of the three trawlers. The German journal SPIEGEL presented her life story in 2020.

On 22 January 2022 a blue plaque was unveiled on Lillian Bilocca's former home, in Coltman Street, off Hessle Road in Hull.
