= Mero-Schmidlin =

UK company

Mero-Schmidlin (UK) plc
- Type: Private
- Industry: Construction
- Founded: 1988
- Headquarters: Camberley, United Kingdom
- Owner: MERO TSK Group, Würzburg
- Website: www.mero-schmidlin.com

Mero-Schmidlin (UK) plc is a business specializing in building construction systems. It is based in Surrey in the United Kingdom, and is owned by the German MERO-TSK Group.

The name MERO is an abbreviation for Mengeringhausen Rohrbauweise (Mengeringhausen's tubular structures).

== History ==
The MERO company was founded by Max Mengeringhausen in Würzburg, Germany in 1948. In 1957, the Mero construction technique, which uses hollow steel tubes connected into steel nodes in a predetermined geometry, was presented at the Berlin International Construction Fair. In 1988, Mero (UK) plc was established to service customers in the United Kingdom.

Then in February 2006, following the acquisition of Schmidlin Facadetechnology AG in Switzerland by TSK Group, Mero (UK) plc's German parent company, Mero (UK) plc changed its name to Mero-Schmidlin (UK) plc.

== Operations ==
The company's activities are as follows:

- Construction systems
- Curtainwalling
- Raised floor systems

== Notable structures using the technique ==
- Stockholm Globe Arena, Sweden – Dome with diameter of 110 m (1989)
- National Indoor Arena, Birmingham, United Kingdom – 128x90m single span spaceframe roof (1990)
- The Eden Project, Cornwall, United Kingdom – Biome structures
- The Glasgow Science Centre, Glasgow, Scotland, United Kingdom – exhibition hall and 3D Cinema to the Building Design Partnership designed science park, completed in 2001.
- The Deep, Kingston upon Hull, United Kingdom – Large aquarium designed by Sir Terry Farrell completed in 2001, having taken seventeen months to construct.

== See also ==
- Space frame
