= The Deep (aquarium) =

Public aquarium in Hull, England

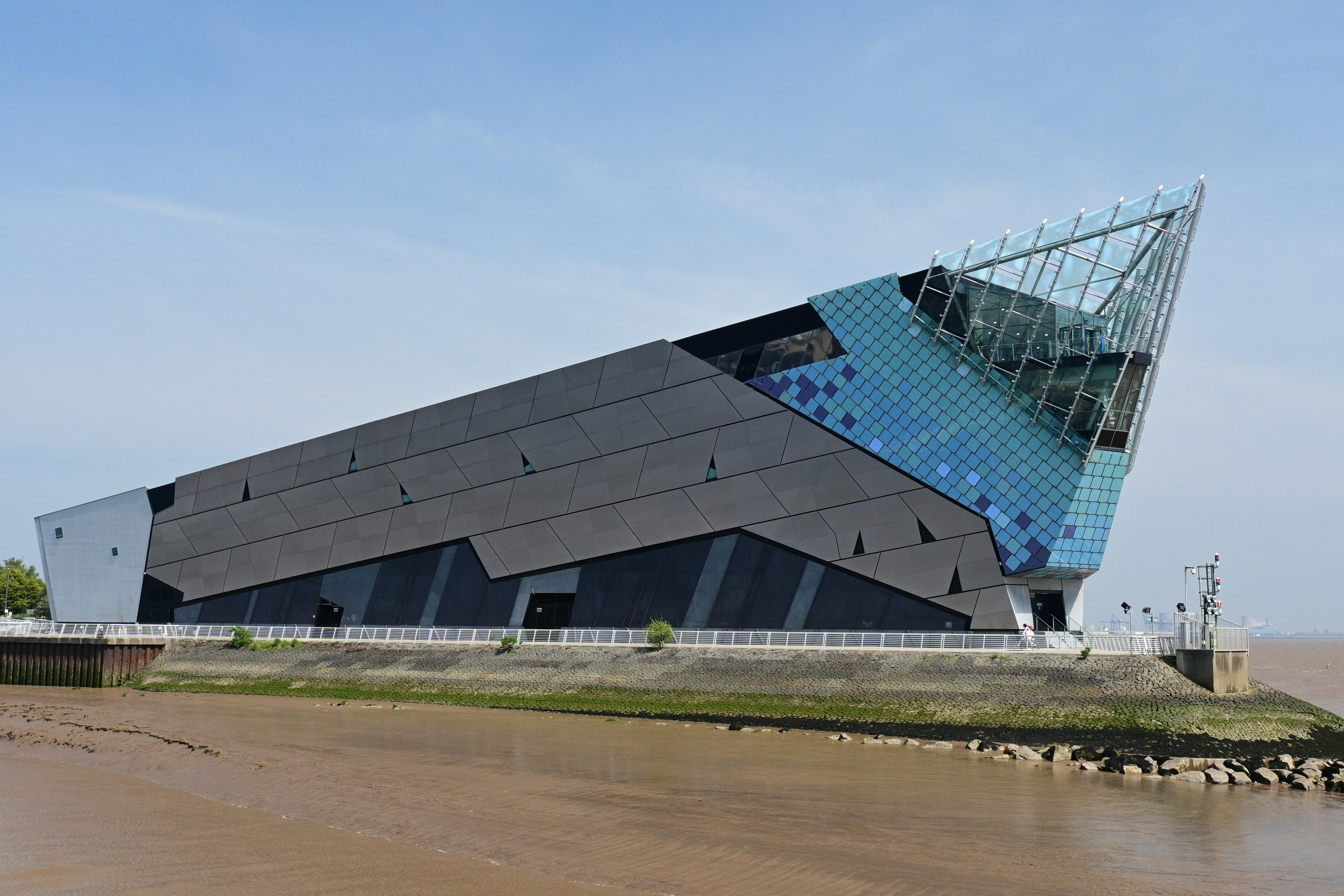
- Interactive map of The Deep
- 53°44′19″N 0°19′50″W
- Date opened: 2002
- Location: Hull, England
- No. of animals: 3,500+
- Volume of largest tank: 2.5 million litres (550,000 imp gal; 660,000 US gal)
- Memberships: BIAZA
- Website: http://www.thedeep.co.uk

The Deep is a public aquarium situated at Sammy's Point, at the confluence of the River Hull and the Humber Estuary in Kingston upon Hull, England. It opened in March 2002.

The exhibits contain, 2,500,000 litres (550,000 imp gal) of water and 87 tonnes (86 long tons) of salt housed in a building designed by Terry Farrell and built as part of the UK National Lottery's Millennium Commission project.

The Deep is also a landmark centre for marine research. A team of aquarists look after the animals in The Deep's collection as well as carrying out research into the marine environment. In 2013, the aquarium was voted the best family place to visit in Hull.

The Deep is a charitable public aquarium dedicated to increasing people's enjoyment and understanding of the world's oceans.

== History ==
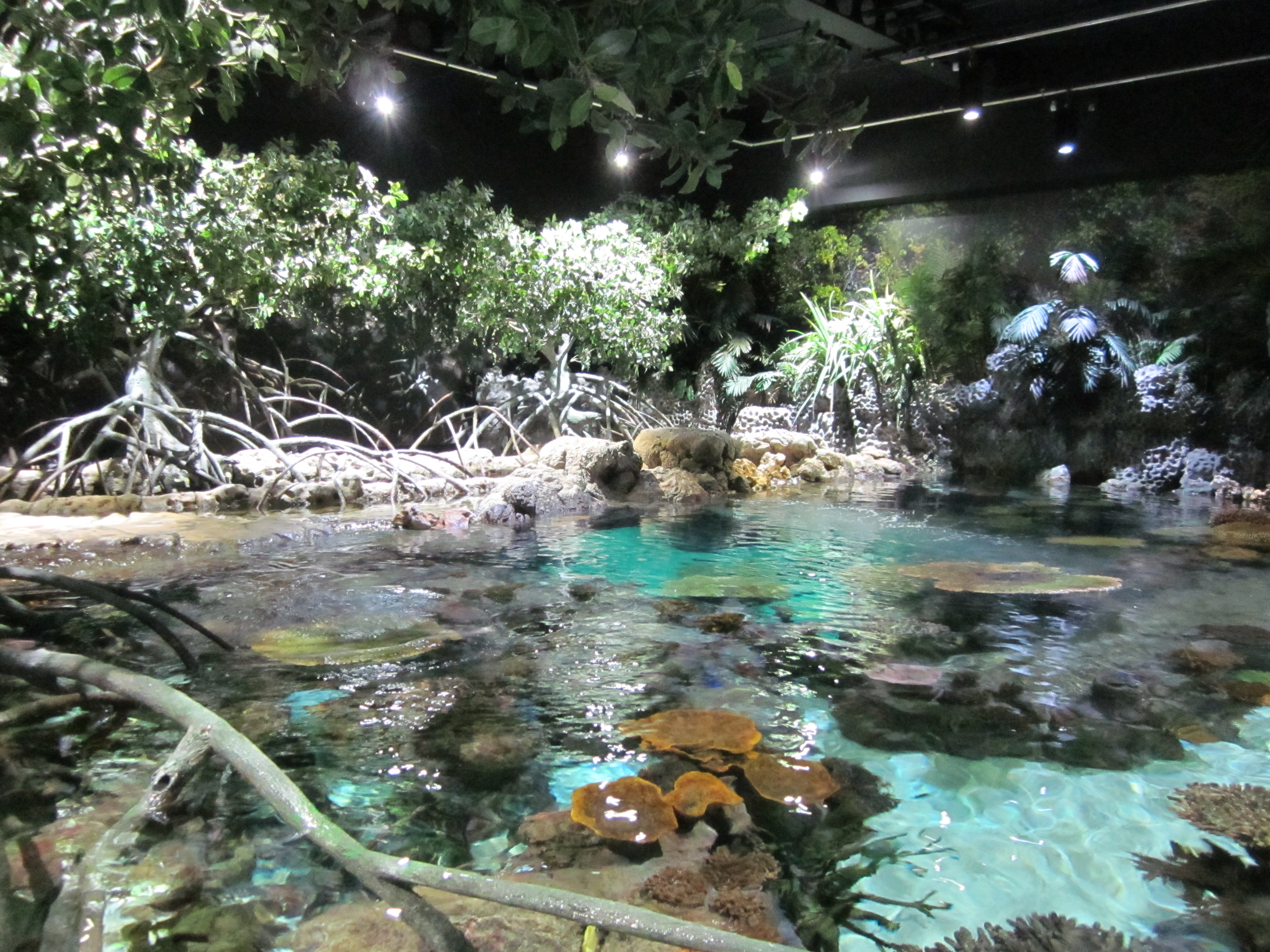
Lagoon, top view

Situated at the confluence of two rivers, Sammy's Point has a history going back at least to the 16th century, when Hull Castle was built on part of the site. Parts of this were made into a new fortification (The Citadel) in 1681. When the Victoria Dock was built in 1850, mud that was dug up for the dock was used to extend the foreshore and create the land that now holds The Deep. Sammy's Point was named for Martin Samuelson, who built a shipyard there in 1857. The land was bought by a succession of owners, all in the ship business, and was then used by the Humber Conservancy as a buoy depot, but was abandoned in the 1980s.

About half of the financing for the aquarium was from the Millennium Commission, with the rest of the £52.285 million for initial construction coming from various other sources. Operational funding is from membership, ticket, and retail sales. The building was designed by Terry Farrell, and constructed by Mero-Schmidlin; it took 17 months to build and was finished in 2001.

The aquarium opened to the public in 2002. Over eight million people have visited since its opening.

In 2013, the aquarium was voted the best family place to visit in Hull.

The draw for the Third Round Proper of the FA Cup took place on 8 December 2014 at The Deep and was broadcast live on BBC Two.

As part of Made in Hull, the opening season of Hull UK City of Culture 2017 that ran from 1–7 January 2017, Arrivals and Departures was projected onto The Deep.

== Exhibits ==
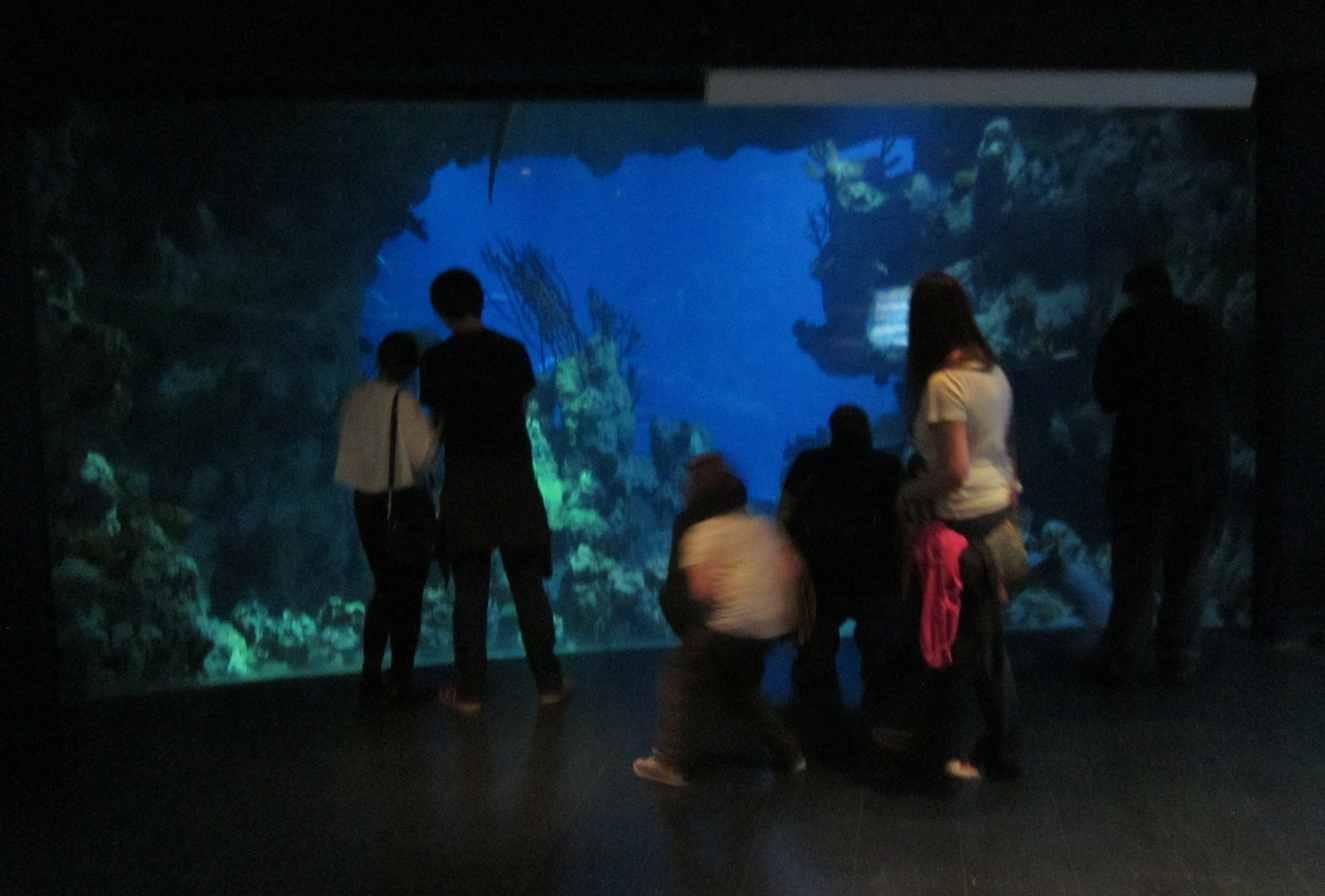
Viewing one of the large tanks

The aquarium uses a combination of hands-on interactive displays, audiovisual presentations, and living exhibits to tell the story of the world's oceans. The museum includes a series of exhibits presenting a chronological journey from the beginning of time through the present day oceans. There is also an interactive area where visitors can learn to control an underwater diving vessel.

Aquaria exhibits include the Tropical Lagoon of Light, teeming with brightly coloured tropical fish and rays, a 10-metre-deep (33 ft) Endless Oceans exhibit containing 2,500,000 litres (550,000 imp gal) of water, Europe's deepest viewing tunnel at 9 metres (30 ft), and a glass lift through the tank. The tank is home to sharks, rays and northern Europe's only pair of green sawfish along with many other fish. The sharks and rays are fed by divers in a daily show. Other marine life on display include fish that glow in the dark, coral, turtles, jellyfish, frogs, penguins, and many species of insects.

== Education ==
The aquarium's education programme hosts 30,000 primary and secondary school students each year. Some of the themes covered in these programmes include food chains, caring for the marine environment, predator-prey relationships, adaptations, and habitats. The Deep also hosts group sleepovers and a variety of special events during the year.

== The Deep Business Centre ==
To aid the funding of The Deep, The Deep Business Centre was set up. Opening in 2001 The Deep Business Centre has been the home for a wide variety of different companies.

Along with offering fully serviced office spaces to organisations, The Deep Business Centre offers 'Pods' which are permanent/semi permanent desk spaces and temporary desk spaces. The Deep Business Centre is part of the Flexible Space Association of which the Head of Business and Corporate of The Deep is chair and The Hull & Humber Chamber of Commerce.
