= Invisible Flock =

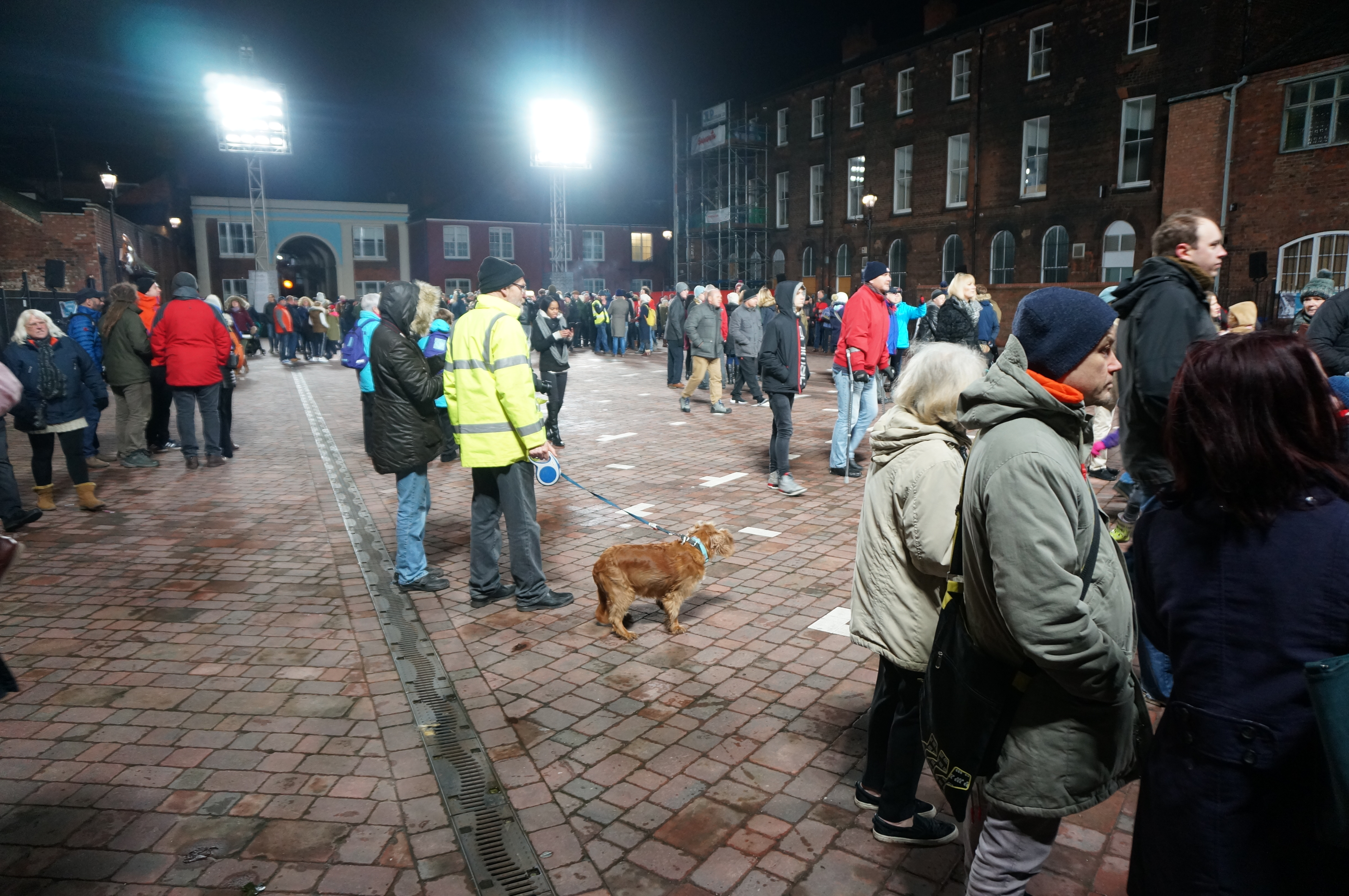
Invisible Flock's sound installation. Zebedee's Yard, Kingston-Upon-Hull. January 2017.

Invisible Flock is an interactive arts studio that is based in Yorkshire Sculpture Park and The Hub at Wellcome Collection, England. The collective makes innovative, participatory artworks, such as the sound installation that they created in Zebedee's Yard for Made in Hull, the opening season of Hull UK City of Culture 2017.

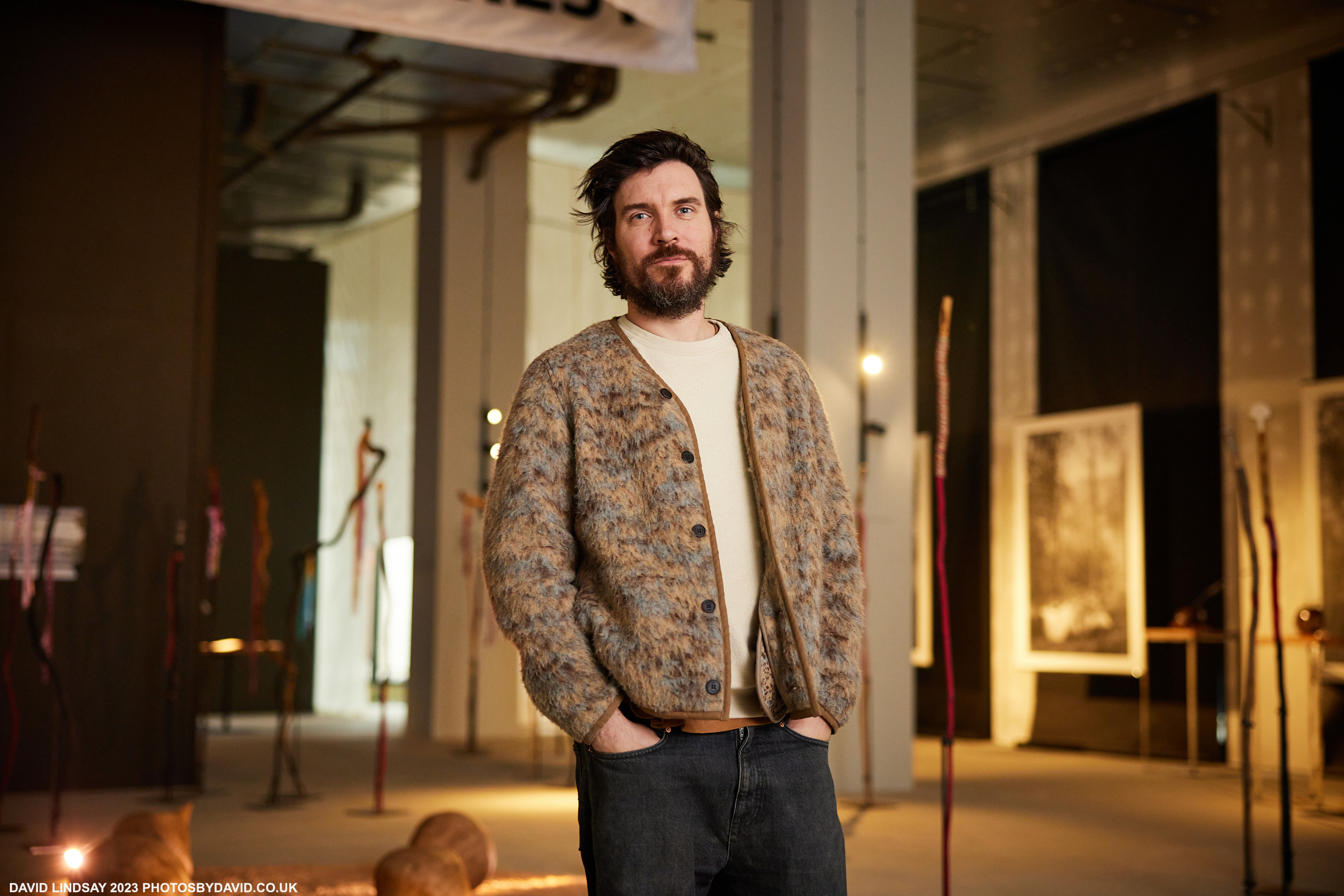
Ben Eaton, Invisible Flock - THIS IS A FOREST LEEDS 2023
