= Harry Eddom =

English sailor

- Born: c. 1941
- Occupation: Sailor

Harry Eddom (born c. 1941) is a former English trawlerman. He was the sole survivor of the Hull triple trawler tragedy which claimed the lives of 58 Hull sailors in January and February 1968.

== The Ross Cleveland sinking ==
Eddom was the first mate on board the Ross Cleveland. In February 1968, the trawler was seeking shelter near Arnarnes in Ísafjarðardjúp from hurricane-force winds and blizzards, which were causing dangerous amounts of ice to form on the vessel's superstructure and radar. The Ross Cleveland's captain attempted to move her from a dangerous position to a safer one during the evening of 4 February, but the ship, overwhelmed by the wind and sea, capsized and sank. At the time, Eddom was in his waterproof gear clearing ice from the masts, radar and deck, in a constant battle. He was knocked overboard but managed to reach a raft, along with Barry Rogers, an 18-year-old deckhand, and the 30-year old bosun, Walter Hewitt. The raft drifted for several hours before reaching shore in Seyðisfjörður. By that time, both Rogers and Hewitt had died from exposure. Eddom walked ashore at the end of the fjord, where he found a summer house but was unable to break into it. Instead he went behind the house, to shelter himself from the wind, and stood there until the morning, afraid that if he sat down he would fall asleep and die. In the morning he was discovered by the 14-year-old son of a farmer, Guðmann Guðmundsson, who led him to his family farm.

The news of his rescue caused a media frenzy as British newspapers scrambled for the exclusive account of his escape, with The Sun flying his wife, Rita Eddom, and family to Iceland. When they arrived in Keflavík Airport, a fight broke out between The Sun staff and other British reporters, and again in Ísafjörður where the hospital staff had to fight off the reporters who tried to storm the main entrance to reach Eddom.

== Later life ==
11 weeks after the sinking, Eddom was back at sea aboard the Ross Antares. He was the captain of the trawler Benella H 132 during the second Cod War and in December 1972, he had his fishing nets cut off by the ICGV Óðinn, the same coast guard ship that saved 18 British sailors from the trawler Notts. County, that wrecked in Ísafjarðardjúp the night the Ross Cleveland sank.

Eddom's story was featured in the 2001 book Útkall í djúpinu by Óttar Sveinsson.
