= Christine Jensen Burke =

New Zealand-Australian climber

Chris Jensen Burke
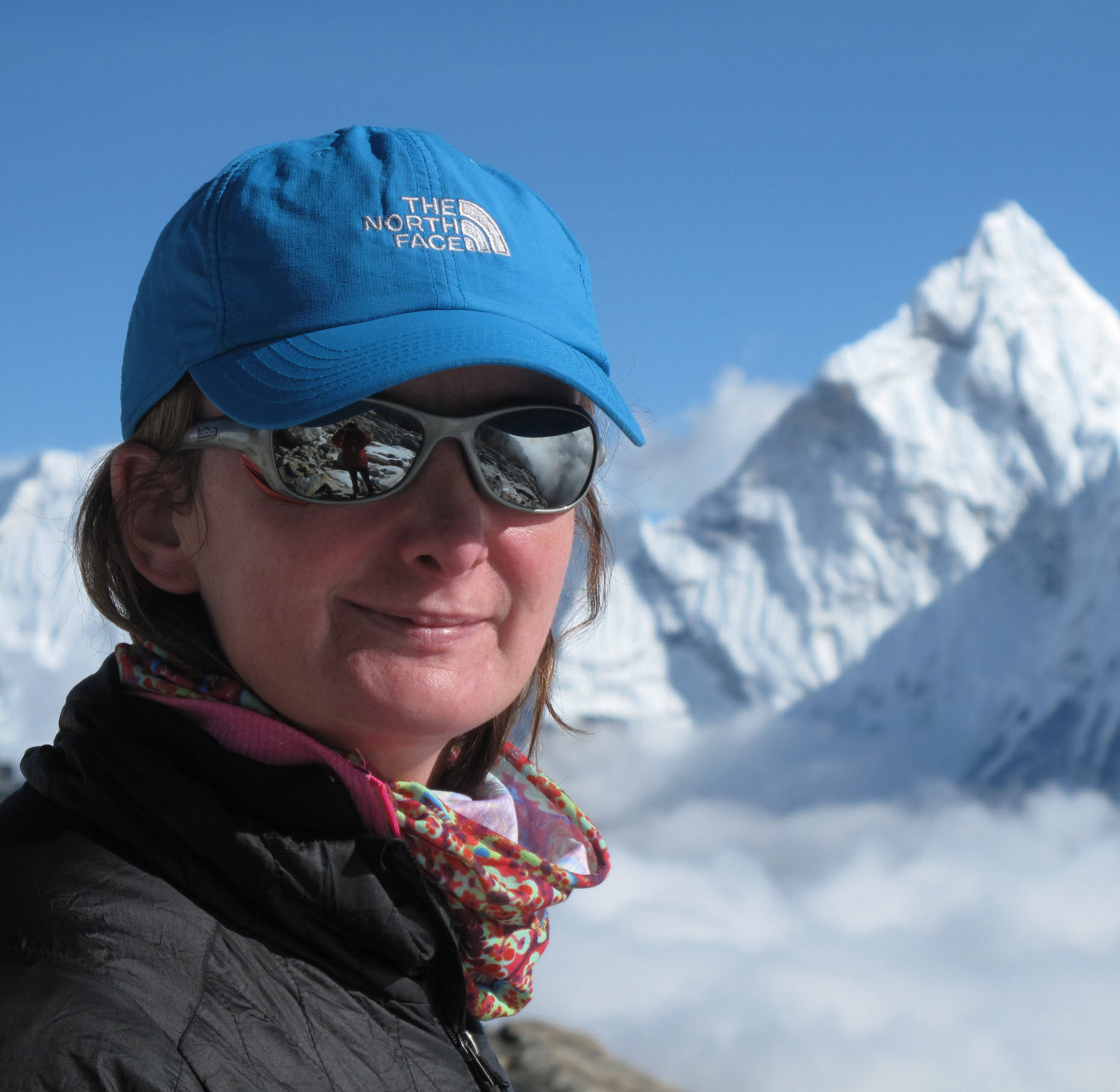
- Chris Jensen Burke

Personal information
- Nationality: New Zealand and Australia
- Born: 2 July 1968 (age 58) New Zealand

Climbing career
- Type of climber: High altitude
- Major ascents: Everest, K2 (2nd highest), Kanchenjunga (3rd), Lhotse (4th), Makalu (5th), Cho-Oyu (6th), Manaslu (8th), Annapurna (10th), Gasherbrum 1 (11th), Gasherbrum 2 (13th)
- Known for: First New Zealand and Australian woman to climb K2; first New Zealand and Australian woman to successfully climb the Seven Summits (Carstensz list); first and fourth respectively to complete the Kosciuszko list

Chris Jensen Burke (born 2 July 1968) is a New Zealand–Australian mountain climber who was the first New Zealand or Australian woman to reach the summit of K2. Since climbing Mount Everest on 20 May 2011, Burke has climbed nine other eight-thousanders, including K2 on 26 July 2014 and Kanchenjunga on 17 May 2018. She is also the first New Zealand or Australian woman to complete the Seven Summits (Carstensz list).

== Climbing career ==
Burke commenced the Seven Summits endeavor by successfully reaching the summit of Kilimanjaro on 6 August 2010, and completed the last of the Seven Summits ('Bass' list) with her successful climb of Mount Elbrus in Russia on 25 July 2012. She completed the 'Messner' list on 15 January 2013, on successful completion of her Carstensz Pyramid climb.

She reached the summit of Mount Everest on 20 May 2011.

== Seven Summits ==
- 2010
  - Kilimanjaro
- 2011
  - Mt Everest
- 2011
  - Mt Kosciuszko
- 2012
  - Mt Vinson
- 2012
  - Aconcagua
- 2012
  - Denali
- 2012
  - Mt Elbrus
- 2013
  - Carstensz Pyramid

== Eight-thousanders ==
- 2011
  - Mt Everest
- 2013
  - Lhotse
  - Gasherbrum 2
  - Gasherbrum 1
  - Manaslu
- 2014
  - Makalu
  - K2
  - Cho-Oyu
- 2016
  - Annapurna
- 2018
  - Kanchenjunga

== Personal life ==
Burke has engaged in numerous private charitable initiatives in Nepal, including fundraising for and supporting disadvantaged and trafficked women and girls.

She lives in Australia.
