= Queen Victoria Square =

Public square in Kingston upon Hull, England

- Queen Victoria Square in July 2026
- Interactive map of Queen Victoria Square
- Namesake: Queen Victoria
- Location: Kingston upon Hull, England
- Postal code: HU1
- Coordinates: 53°44′37.7″N 0°20′21.1″W

Queen Victoria Square is a public square located in the centre of Kingston upon Hull, England. The square is dedicated to Queen Victoria, and contains numerous buildings including Hull City Hall, the Maritime Museum and Ferens Art Gallery. A statue of Queen Victoria, designed in 1903 by J. S. Gibson also stands in the square, and is listed Grade II.
