= Hull Maritime Museum =

Maritime museum in Kingston upon Hull, England

- Established: 1912
- Location: Kingston upon Hull
- Coordinates: 53.7439°N 0.3386°W
- Type: History
- Website: Hull Maritime Museum

The Hull Maritime Museum is a museum in Kingston upon Hull, England, that explores the seafaring heritage of the city and its environs. The museum's stated mission is "To preserve and make available the maritime history of Hull and east Yorkshire through artefacts and documents".

== History and site ==
Detail of the Dock Offices building

The museum, originally known as the Museum of Fisheries and Shipping, opened in 1912 in Pickering Park. It moved to its current location, the Dock Offices building, in 1974. The Dock Offices building is so-named as it is the former headquarters of the Hull Dock Company, which operated all docks in Hull until 1893. Built between 1867 and 1871, it is a Grade II* listed building and a striking example of Victorian architecture. The building stands in Queen Victoria Square, opposite the Queen's Gardens, in Hull's city centre. Hull City Council currently operates and maintains the museum.

In January 2020, the museum temporarily closed for preparation for a £11 million programme of conservation and modernisation to begin, with Purcell, Beckett Rankine, Haley Sharpe Design, Tricolour, Simpson and Dunston Ship Repairs on the project team. Renovation work commenced in January 2022, following the removal of around 50,000 items from the museum into storage throughout 2020 and 2021. The museum was scheduled to re-open in 2025 as the centrepiece of Hull's "Maritime City Project", featuring an additional exhibition floor and a spiral staircase providing access to one of the building's domes, as well as a new glass roof in the building's atrium, following the relocation of storage, research and conservation centre in the adjacent Dock Office Chambers. In November 2024, Hull City Council announced that the reopening would be pushed back to spring 2026. The museum reopened on 8 August 2026 with over 50,000 people visiting in the first month.

== Exhibits and collections ==
The period of time covered by the exhibits extends back to the Bronze Age and through the Middle Ages, but the museum primarily concerns itself with Hull's maritime history from the 19th century onward. The museum's exhibits are arranged along the following primary themes:

Part of the collection of scrimshaw at Hull Maritime Museum

=== Arctic whaling heritage ===
Inuit artifacts at Hull Maritime Museum including model kayaks, a soapstone figurine and a pair of kamiik boots

The museum dedicates an entire gallery to Hull's whaling industry, which peaked in the early 19th century. Dozens of vessels ventured into the Arctic waters (particularly those around Greenland) during this period. The gallery contains personal effects, shipboard items, models, and artwork (including the largest collection of scrimshaw in Europe), and Inuit artifacts, including a kayak. The revamped museum contains a 40 foot long skeleton of a North Atlantic right whale which was hunted to the brink of extinction during the whaling era.

=== North Sea fishing industry ===
The city's fishing industry rose to prominence in the mid-19th century, and one gallery of the museum documents the history of the industry as it expanded from the North Sea into more northerly waters. This gallery makes use of models of the industry's various ocean-going vessels, from simple cobles to large trawlers.

=== Maritime trade ===
Hull's tradition of ocean-going commerce dates from the Middle Ages and has historically targeted the nations of Scandinavia and the Baltic Sea. The Court Room in the Hull Docks building, once for use by the Hull Dock Company's shareholders and now the venue for temporary exhibitions, also pays hommage to Hull's commercial past and present. The room houses a frieze containing the coats of arms of the cities with which Hull has historically had trade relations.

=== Online: Hull and the sea ===
As part of its online Hull Museums Collection, Hull City Council launched the Hull and the sea website in 2008. The website allows users to virtually browse the maritime museum's collection, from works of scrimshaw to descriptions and images of the seagoing vessels from the city's past.

Projections on the Hull Maritime Museum during Hull's year as UK City of Culture

=== Hull City of Culture 2017 ===
During Hull's year as UK City of Culture the Maritime Museum played a prominent role in the opening three-month season entitled Made in Hull. At the opening event during the first week the building was one of three in Victoria Square which had multimedia projections displayed on them, attracting over 300,000 visitors. Throughout the three-month season the Museum hosted a multimedia installation called Bowhead depicting a bowhead whale.

== See also ==
- Grade II* listed buildings in the East Riding of Yorkshire
- Listed buildings in Kingston upon Hull (Myton Ward)
- Arctic Corsair, former trawler, now a museum on the River Hull in Hull
- Spurn Lightship, former lightship, now a museum in Humber Dock, Hull
