= Hull triple trawler tragedy =

1968 marine accidents off the British coast

The Hull triple trawler tragedy was the sinking of three trawlers from the British fishing port of Kingston upon Hull during January and February 1968. A total of 58 crew members died, with just one survivor. The three sinkings brought widespread national publicity to the conditions in which fishermen worked, and triggered an official inquiry which led to major changes to employment and working practices within the British fishing industry.

== The sinkings ==
=== St Romanus ===
The St Romanus sailed from Hull on 10 January 1968 and the last firm contact with the vessel was a radio telephone call the same evening. However, despite a company policy that ships should report their position and catch details daily, the alarm was not raised until 26 January, after a number of failed attempts by the owners to contact the ship by radio. It was then discovered that a liferaft found on 13 January by another vessel had come from the St Romanus. A search began, but by 30 January the families were told that there was little hope for the vessel and her crew of 20. Later, at the official enquiry, it was stated that a mayday call from the ship had been heard on 11 January by another ship, but had not been passed on.

=== Kingston Peridot ===
The Kingston Peridot had also sailed from Hull on 10 January with a crew of 20, and by 26 January she was fishing off north-east Iceland in foul weather. She told another trawler by radio that she was having difficulties with ice build-up on the ship, and arranged to move east to join them, but no further contact was established and on 29 January one of her liferafts was washed ashore. This, with debris found subsequently, indicated that the vessel had sunk on 27 January. News of her loss was received in Hull on 30 January, just as hope was fading for the crew of St. Romanus.

=== Ross Cleveland ===
Ross Cleveland sailed on 20 January, before the loss of the first two trawlers became known. She was bound for the north coast of Iceland with a full crew, but one man, Colin Ireland, was put ashore for medical treatment, leaving 19 on board. Conditions were very poor and on 3 February, following a weather warning, she made for Grænahlíð, a narrow and relatively sheltered inlet on Iceland's north-west coast. A number of other ships were there to wait out what became a long and exceptionally severe storm, with hurricane-force winds and blizzards, causing dangerous amounts of ice to form on the vessels' superstructure and radar. The Ross Cleveland's captain attempted to move her from a dangerous position to a safer one during the evening of 4 February, but the ship was overwhelmed by the wind and sea, capsized and sank. The last radio message received by the other ships was from the captain, and ran:

I am going over. We are laying over. Help me. I am going over. Give my love and the crew's love to the wives and families.

— Phil Gay, skipper of the Ross Cleveland

Other ships attempted to assist the Ross Cleveland but were defeated by the storm, and two more vessels, the Notts. County and the Heiðrún II, were wrecked in Ísafjörður that night, the latter lost with all hands. News of the sinking reached Hull on 5 February, six days after that of the Kingston Peridot. At first it was believed all aboard Ross Cleveland had died, but on 6 February Harry Eddom, the mate, was discovered alive, having been washed ashore in a liferaft the previous day. Two other men had been with him in the raft, but both had died of exposure before reaching the shore.

== Safety campaign ==
The trawlermen and their families formed a close-knit community in Hull, and the first two losses were a devastating blow. A safety campaign led by fisherman's wife Lillian Bilocca began; Meetings were arranged between trawlermen's wives and trawler owners, and also with government ministers, and some wives picketed the dock to ensure all departing ships carried radio operators, attracting much national media attention. The national newspapers called it 'The Headscarf Campaign', as headscarves were popular with working women in the 1960s. As the wives' deputation arrived at the dock in front of TV cameras and journalists on 5 February for the meeting with the trawler owners, news broke of the loss of Ross Cleveland. The following day the women travelled to London, again with massive media coverage, and met ministers to discuss a variety of reforms to the fishing industry. The same day, trawler owners were instructed to implement new safety arrangements based on the outcome of the meeting, with immediate effect.

== Inquiries ==
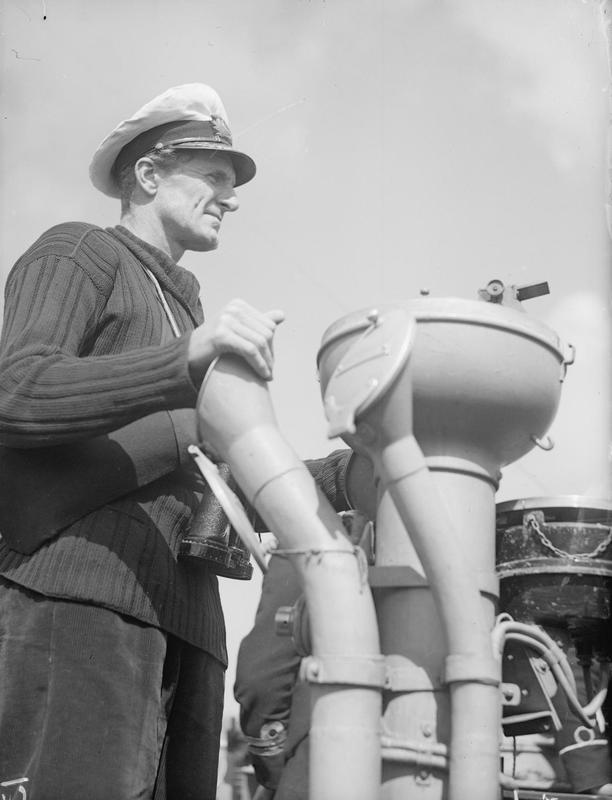
Admiral Sir Deric Holland-Martin (pictured 1943) led a Committee of Inquiry into the tragedy

There were official inquiries into the sinking of each ship. These concluded that St. Romanus had been lost on 11 January for reasons unknown; that Kingston Peridot had probably capsized on either 26 or 27 January due to instability in the extreme weather conditions; and that Ross Cleveland had been insufficiently stable to cope with the weather and the build-up of ice at the time. Various recommendations were made, and these were considered in greater detail by a government Committee of Inquiry, led by Admiral Sir Deric Holland-Martin, into safety in the British fishing industry. Its report, published in May 1969, brought about wide-reaching changes. These included tighter regulation of trawler design and construction; more and better safety equipment; legal standards for radio equipment, operators and reporting procedures; and a mass of improvements to employment, training and working practices and industrial relations.

The tragedy continued to influence subsequent UK legislation on maritime safety: Harry Eddom's survival was cited in Parliamentary debates in 1986 over improvements in the provision of lifejackets and emergency clothing in liferafts (Safety at Sea Bill 1986).

== Aftermath ==
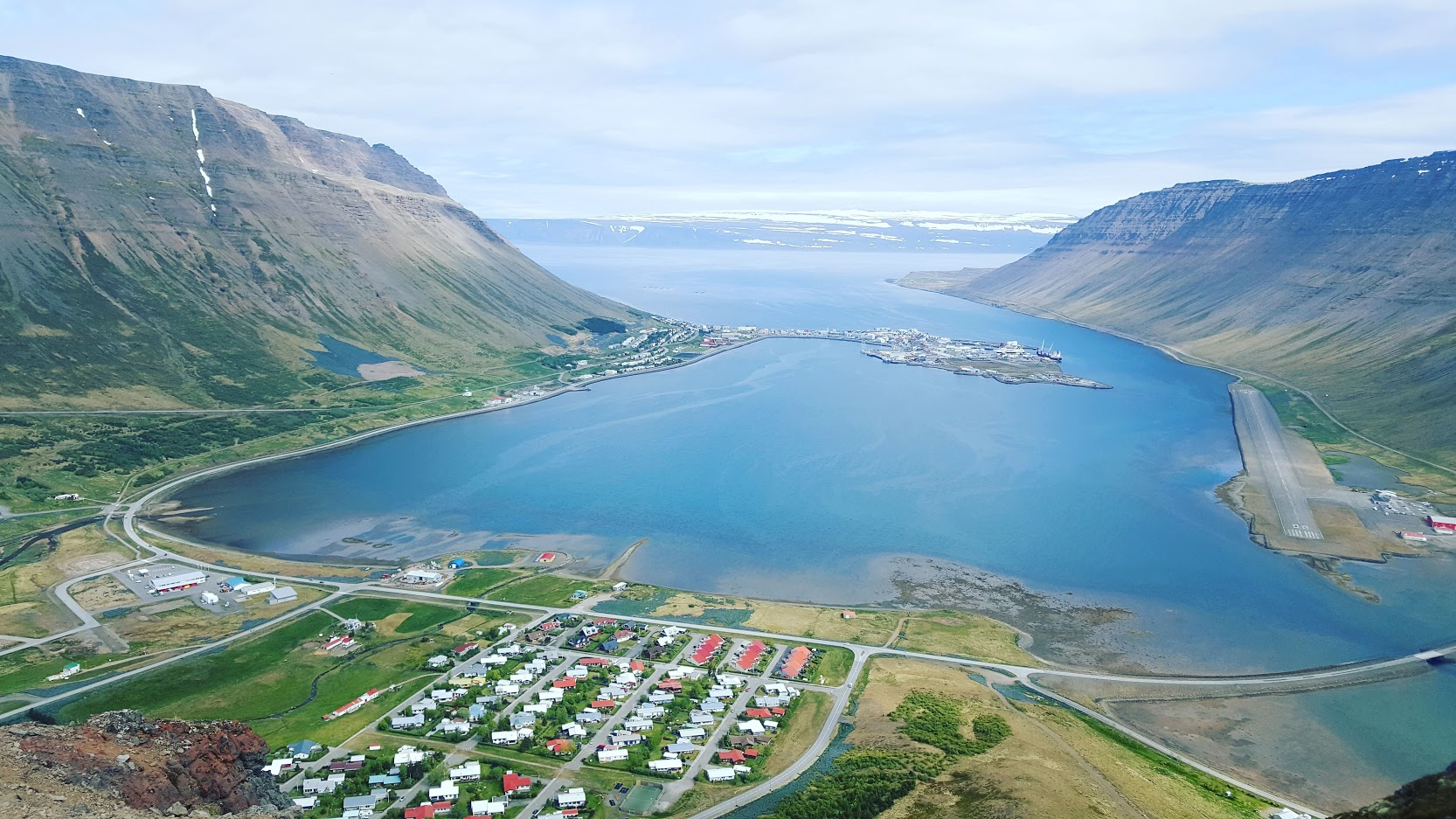
Skutulsfjörður fjord, Iceland (pictured 2019)

In 2002 the wreckage of the Ross Cleveland, which lies at a depth of around 100 meters outside the fjord of Skutulsfjörður, was filmed via mini submarine by a BBC team. The pictures appeared to confirm the belief that a build-up of ice on the superstructure had contributed to the sinking. In January and February 2008, the 40th anniversary of the tragedy was commemorated at a series of events in Hull. The 50th anniversary was marked on 4 March 2018 with a service at Hull Minster mirroring the 1968 service.

== Sources ==
- Creed, Rupert (1998). Turning the Tide: The 1968 Trawler Tragedy and the Wives' Campaign for Safety. Hull: Back Door Press. ISBN 0-9534555-0-5.
