= Annie Major =

British politician and first woman Lord Mayor of Kingston upon Hull

Annie Major MBE, JP
- Born: 25 May 1904; Kingston Upon Hull, England
- Died: 22 January 1981 (aged 76)
- Occupation(s): Politician and mayor

Annie Major MBE (25 May 1904 – 22 January 1981) was Lord Mayor of Kingston upon Hull in 1965-66. Major was the first woman to be Lord Mayor of Kingston upon Hull.

== Early life ==
Annie Major was born in Hull in 1904 to Robert Major and his wife Mary Anne (née Sanderson).

Major worked for the Humber Rubber and Engineers' Supplies Ltd, becoming the secretary to the managing director.

== Councillor and Lord Mayor ==
Major was elected as a Councillor in 1945 for the Municipal Association Group, serving until 1958, and again from 1960. In 1961 she was an unsuccessful candidate for the Aldermanic bench. She was Lord Mayor in 1965-66.

She was awarded the MBE in 1965.

A portrait of her, painted by William Dring, was commissioned in 1966 for the Guildhall.

== Personal life ==
She died in 1981, aged 76.
