= Harry Edwards =

Harry Edwards may refer to:

- Harry Edwards (Australian footballer) (born 2000), Australian rules footballer
- Harry Edwards (director) (1889–1952), Canadian-born American director/writer at Columbia Pictures
- Henry Edwards (entomologist) (1827–1891), English-born actor, writer and butterfly scientist, known as "Harry"
- Harry Edwards (English footballer) (1872–1940), English association footballer of the 1890s
- Harry Edwards (healer) (1893–1976), spiritual healer
- Harry Edwards (politician) (1927–2012), Australian politician
- Harry Edwards (sociologist) (born 1942), American professor, author, and civil rights activist
- Harry Edwards (trade unionist) (1874–1958), British trade union activist
- Harry Stillwell Edwards (1855–1938), American journalist, novelist, and poet
- Harry T. Edwards (born 1940), American federal judge

== See also ==
- Harold Edwards (disambiguation)
- Harry Edward (1898–1973), British Olympic runner
- Henry Edwards (disambiguation)
