= Walter Greendale =

British trade unionist and politician

Walter Greendale (10 December 1930 – 12 September 2012) was a British trade unionist and politician.

Born in Kingston-upon-Hull, Greendale became a docker, and took evening classes with the University of Hull. He joined the Transport and General Workers' Union (TGWU), and sat on the unofficial Joint Shop Stewards' Committee, through which he became an ally of Jack Jones.

In 1970, Greendale was elected to the National Executive of the TGWU, in which role he sought to help the union keep pace with industrial developments, such as containerisation, expand the National Dock Labour Scheme to include all ports, and build solidarity with unions in other industrial sectors. In 1982, he was elected as chairman of the union.

Greendale served on the General Council of the Trades Union Congress (TUC) from 1978 to 1986, one of the few members at the time not to hold a full-time union post. Despite this, he was able to represent the TUC on the Health and Safety Executive and to the Workers' Educational Association.

In 1986, The Sun newspaper ran a campaign against Greendale, publishing a front-page story with the headline "The Commie Grip Inside Britain's Biggest Union", alleging that he manipulated the results of union elections. Greendale, a member of the Labour Party and prominent supporter of Tony Benn, successfully sued the newspaper for defamation, but he lost re-election as chairman, and in 1988 also lost his seat on the executive.

The National Dock Labour Scheme was abolished in 1989, and Greendale took part in a brief national strike. However, a majority of Hull dockers soon voted to abandon the strike and return to work. Greendale alone remained on the picket line, accompanied by dockers from Liverpool. He expected to lose his job as a result but, after the national strike was called off, his fellow shop stewards secured his continued employment, by threatening a walk-out if he was not kept on.

Greendale was re-elected to the union's national executive in 1990, but by this time was focusing on local politics. He was elected to Hull City Council, representing the Labour Party.

Trade union offices
Preceded by Stan Pemberton	Chairman of the Transport and General Workers' Union; 1982–1986	Succeeded by Brian Nicholson
