= Edwin Davis Company =

Former department store in Hull

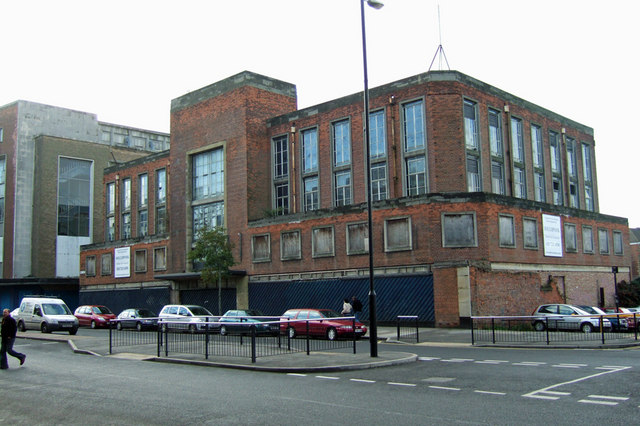
The former Edwin Davis department store at Bond Street, Hull. Taken December 2007.

The Edwin Davis Company was a department store based in Kingston upon Hull that traded from around 1840 until 1978.

== History ==
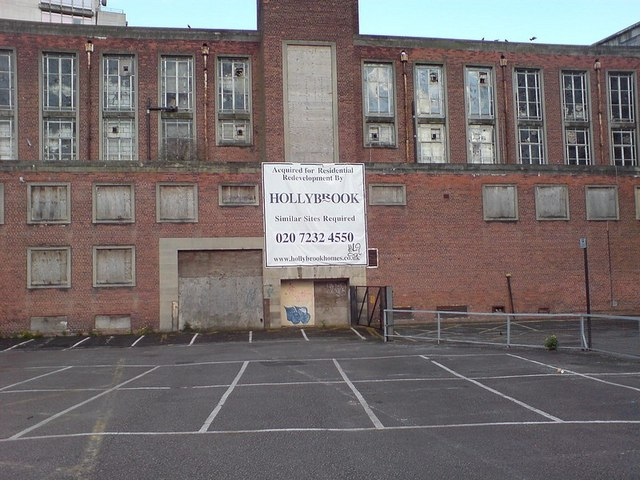
The back of the former department store in May 2007. A large sign is fitted claiming that the building has been acquired by Hollybrook Limited for residential development.

The business was established in Market Place in the city in around 1840, later expanding to take in the shops on both sides. By 1910, their premises had been re-fronted, possessing classical columns at either side of its huge shop frontage. During the early 1900s the store had become a prime spot for shoppers, but as a result of a bomb dropped from a First World War Zeppelin in 1915, the shop was completely destroyed. The replacement store, constructed in Bond Street in around 1920, was also badly damaged during the Second World War. During the 1930s the company used the slogan 'the store with the right prices'. The company's third and final store, also built in Bond Street in around 1952, remained open until the late 1970s. The company had operated in the city for over a century.

After the company closed in 1978, the former department store premises saw many uses, including as the 'Evolution' nightclub during the 1990s and as an amusement arcade, but none of these were permanent and was last used in around 1998. Since then, the building has stood derelict. Due to its prominence in the city and its longstanding dilapidated condition, the building has been targeted by the Hull City Council, who in February 2015 issued a legal notice to the building's owners requiring essential repairs to be carried out. It is unknown if these repairs were indeed undertaken, however as of June 2016, the building still stands derelict. The building has been described as an 'eyesore' and as a 'blight' by some council members.

The current owners of the building, Alpha Properties (London) Limited, have owned the building since January 2010. The previous owners, London based property developers Hollybrook Limited, had submitted plans in March 2005 to build 138 apartments and 51 parking spaces following demolition of the existing building, pledging that an investment of £15 million would be made in the city. At the time, the company stated that they aimed to 'drag one of England's less glamorous cities towards an era of modern city living' but claimed that their 'work was cut out' in attracting people to the city from across England. The company's plans did not come to fruition however and the site was put back on the market at £1.5 million in January 2010. As of June 2016, the site is being advertised by estate agents Garness Jones at £1 million.

Recently, some members of the Hull City Council have expressed an interest in building a 5,000 seat ice arena on the site, at a cost of up to £7 million. This would replace the current ice arena, based at Kingston Park, that was built in the 1980s and is now nearing the end of its life. In 2015, it was envisaged that an 'Olympic-sized' swimming pool and ice rink could be built on the site, however it was later decided in March 2016 to improve the city's current swimming facilities instead and invest over £750,000 into the city's two main swimming pools. Whilst the idea of a swimming pool was scrapped it is hoped that a new purpose built ice arena at the site will still go-ahead.

In July 2015, a group of historians including members of the Hull Civic Society, toured the interior of the building, however it was found to be completely ruined inside.

On 20 July 2016, the owners of the former department store confirmed that they were revisiting plans to turn it into accommodation, citing 'improving market conditions' as a result of the impending UK City of Culture celebrations in 2017.

The building was completely demolished and cleared by the end of 2020. Part of Bond street was occasionally blocked by workmen to ensure safety of drivers.
