= Leo Schultz (councillor) =

British politician

Sir Leo Schultz OBE
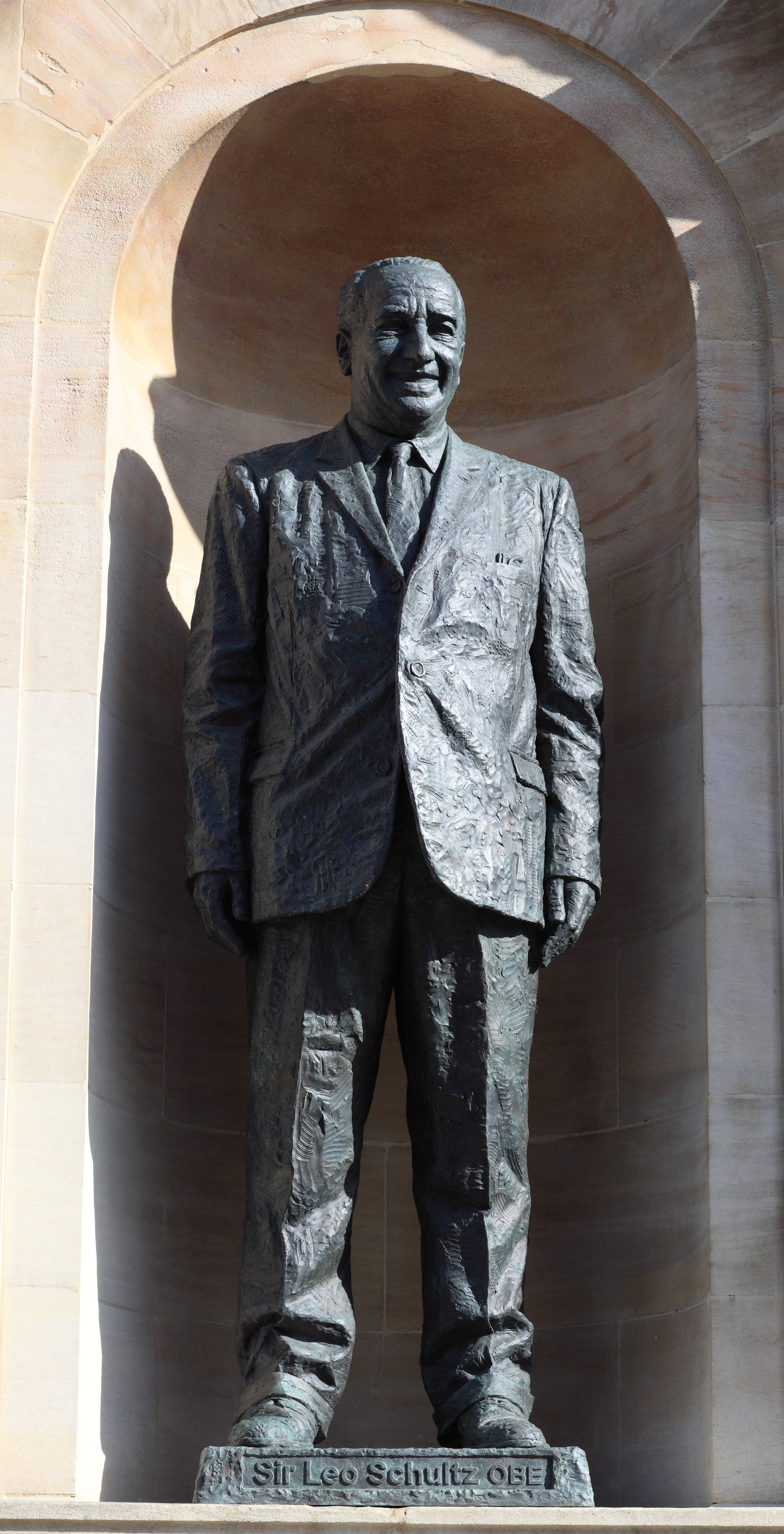
- Schultz statue, at the Guildhall in Hull
- Born: 4 February 1900; Kingston upon Hull, East Riding of Yorkshire, England
- Died: 21 July 1991 (aged 91); Kingston upon Hull, East Riding of Yorkshire, England
- Monuments: Statue at the Guildhall in Hull
- Occupation: Politician
- Years active: 1926–1979
- Political party: Labour
- Spouse: Kate Pickersgill (m. 1928; died 1975)
- Children: Lionel Schultz; Robert Rosner (adopted)
- Parent: Solomon Schultz

Sir Joseph Leopold Schultz, OBE (4 February 1900 – 21 July 1991) was a British politician who was a dominant figure in Kingston upon Hull during the 20th century.

He was an active Labour councillor for many years, and was leader of Hull City Council from 1945 to 1979, except for two years 1969–1971 when Labour were in opposition.

== Biography ==
Leo Schultz was born in 1900, the son of a Polish immigrant, Solomon Schultz, and his wife Hinda (née Hiller).

At the age of 15 he came first in regional exams for a scholarship for Oxford University, but was told that the university was not a suitable choice for someone of his working-class background and Jewish religion. He later became a socialist and used his skills in the realm of public service, his political career began in 1926 as a Labour councillor for the Myton ward of Hull.

In 1919 he met, and in 1928 married Kate (Kitty) Pickersgill.

Before the Second World War, Leo Schultz campaigned for Hull City Council to build bomb shelters. He was successful and the shelters helped save many lives. During the war, he was decorated for his work as an Air Raid Warden, and also served as Lord Mayor from 1942–3.

From 1945 to 1979 Schultz was leader of the Labour group on Hull City Council. He also served as leader of the council for the whole of that period except for two years 1969–1971 when the Conservatives took control of the council, in which time Schultz served as leader of the opposition. His role in Kingston upon Hull's public life led him to receiving the moniker "Lion of Hull", or "Mr. Hull".

He received an OBE in 1946, in part for his work during the war, and was knighted in 1966 for services to local government, he received an honorary doctorate of Law from Hull University in 1979.

Kitty Schultz died in 1975, Leo Schultz died in 1991 aged 91.

== Tarran scandal ==
After being Lord Mayor, Schultz was implicated in the Robert Greenwood Tarran corruption scandal in Hull Council.

== Legacy ==
The Schultz had a single son Lionel, They also adopted Robert Rosner, a Jewish-Austrian child who left continental Europe on the kindertransport, who became an architect in adult life.

The Sir Leo Schultz High School was established in the Orchard Park Estate, Hull.

Artist Nigel Boonham was commissioned to produce a full-size statue of Sir Leo Schultz, unveiled at Hull's Guildhall in 2011.
