= 2026 Hull City Council election =

2026 English local election

- 7 May 2026

19 of 57 seats to Hull City Council 29 seats needed for a majority

	First party	Second party	Third party
Leader	Mike Ross	Daren Hale	Richard Kelly
Party	Liberal Democrats	Labour	Reform
Seats before	29	23	0
Seats won	8	1	10
Seats after	26	16	10
Seat change	▼3	▼7	▲10
Popular vote	15,941	8,750	17,880
Percentage	31.8%	17.5%	35.7%
Swing	▼12.2pp	▼26.6pp	▲34.5pp
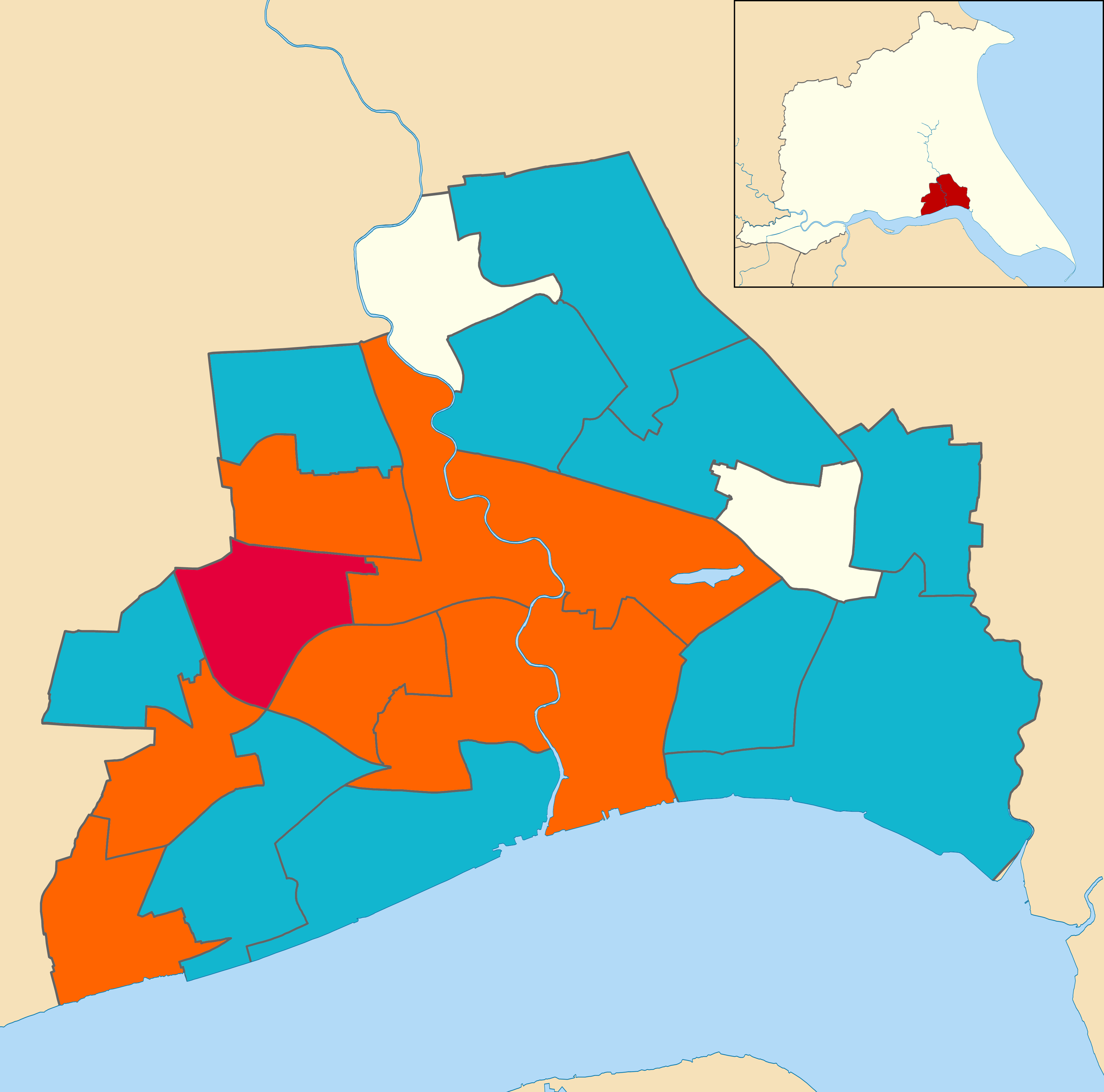
- 2026 Hull City Council Election Map
Leader before election
Mike Ross
Liberal Democrats
Leader after election
Mike Ross
Liberal Democrats
No overall control (Note: Liberal Democrat minority administration.)

The 2026 Hull City Council election was held on 7 May 2026, alongside the other local elections across the United Kingdom being held on the same day, to elect 19 of 57 members of Hull City Council.

Prior to the election, the council was under Liberal Democrat majority control. At the election, the council went under no overall control. The Liberal Democrats remained the largest party, but fell three seats short of a majority. They subsequently managed to form a minority administration, with the incumbent Liberal Democrat leader of the council, Mike Ross, being reappointed to the role at the subsequent annual council meeting on 21 May 2026.

== Council composition ==
After 2024 election		Before 2026 election	
Party	Seats	Party	Seats
Liberal Democrats	31	Liberal Democrats	29
Labour	26	Labour	23
Independent	0	Independent	5

Changes 2024–2026:

- June 2024: Gary Wareing (Labour) leaves party to sit as an independent
- April 2025: Julia Conner (Liberal Democrats) and Sherilee Jepmond (Liberal Democrats) leave party to sit as independents
- May 2025: Hester Bridges (Labour) leaves party to sit as an independent
- September 2025: Peter North (Labour) leaves party to sit as an independent

== Summary ==
=== Background ===
In 2024, the Liberal Democrats retained control of the council.

== Results summary ==
2026 Hull City Council election
Party	This election				Full council			This election		
Party	Candidates	Seats	Net	Seats %	Other	Total	Total %	Votes	Votes %	+/−
Reform	{{{candidates}}}	10	▲10	52.6	0	10	17.5	17,880	35.7	+34.5
Liberal Democrats	{{{candidates}}}	8	▼3	42.1	23	26	45.6	15,941	31.8	-12.2
Labour	{{{candidates}}}	1	▼7	5.3	14	16	28.1	8,750	17.5	-26.6
Green	{{{candidates}}}	0	Steady	0.0	0	0	0.0	6,139	12.2	+9.7
Conservative	{{{candidates}}}	0	Steady	0.0	0	0	0.0	1,202	2.4	-3.5
Independent	{{{candidates}}}	0	Steady	0.0	5	5	0.0	143	0.3	New
TUSC	{{{candidates}}}	0	Steady	0.0	0	0	0.0	60	0.1	-1.3
National Rebirth Party (UK)	{{{candidates}}}	0	Steady	0.0	0	0	0.0	19	0.0	New

== Incumbents ==
Ward	Incumbent councillor	Party	Re-standing
Avenue	Rhiannon Beeson	Liberal Democrats	Yes
Beverley & Newland	David McCobb	Liberal Democrats	No
Boothferry	Maria Coward	Liberal Democrats	Yes
Bricknell	Sharon Hofman	Labour	Yes
Central	Sharon Kassim	Labour	Yes
Derringham	Cheryl Payne	Liberal Democrats	No
Drypool	Linda Chambers	Liberal Democrats	Yes
Holderness	Jackie Dad	Liberal Democrats	Yes
Longhill & Bilton Grange	Tim Kemp	Liberal Democrats	Yes
Marfleet	Patrick Wilkinson	Labour	No
Newington & Gipsyville	Lynn Petrini	Labour	No
North Carr	Anita Harrison	Labour	Yes
Orchard Park	Deborah Matthews	Labour	No
Pickering	Tracey Henry	Liberal Democrats	Yes
Southcoates	Anna Thompson	Labour	Yes
St Andrew's & Docklands	Leanne Fudge	Labour	Yes
Sutton	Terry Keal	Liberal Democrats	Yes
University	Holly Burton	Liberal Democrats	No
West Carr	Rob Pritchard	Liberal Democrats	Yes

== Results ==
An asterisk (*) indicates an incumbent who stood for re-election.

=== Avenue ===
+ Avenue Ward was won by the Labour Party in 2022, so technically this is a Lib Dem gain from Labour. Former Cllr Marjorie Brabazon (Labour) resigned in January 2024, and Cllr Rhiannon Beeson (Lib Dem) was elected in the subsequent by-election.

Avenue
Party	Candidate	Votes	%	±%
Liberal Democrats	Rhiannon Beeson*	1,845	44.9	4.9
Green	Dan Kelly	984	23.9	14.3
Labour	Louis Graves	651	15.8	−27.6
Reform	Paul Burgin	552	13.4	13.4
Conservative	Alex Hayward	60	1.5	−2.0
TUSC	Michael Whale	23	0.6	−3.0
Majority		897	21.0	
Rejected ballots		17		
Turnout		4,131	46.0	
Liberal Democrats hold		Swing	-4.7	

=== Beverley and Newland ===
Beverley and Newland
Party	Candidate	Votes	%	±%
Liberal Democrats	Lucy Lennon	1,812	50.9	−12.9
Reform	Graeme Wightman	800	22.5	22.5
Green	Justyna Malkiewicz-Young	509	14.3	14.3
Labour	Temi Makinde	363	10.2	−18.4
Conservative	James Hawkes	76	2.1	2.1
Majority		1012	28.4	
Rejected ballots		0		
Turnout		3,561	36.2	
Liberal Democrats hold		Swing	-17.7	

=== Boothferry ===
Boothferry
Party	Candidate	Votes	%	±%
Liberal Democrats	Maria Coward*	1,382	44.0	−10.9
Reform	Elena Sayers	1,105	35.2	35.2
Labour	James Ireland	313	10.0	−23.7
Green	Mike Lammiman	261	8.3	2.9
Conservative	John Sharp	80	2.6	2.6
Majority		277	8.8	
Rejected ballots		6		
Turnout		3,148	35.7	
Liberal Democrats hold		Swing	-23.0	

=== Bricknell ===
Bricknell
Party	Candidate	Votes	%	±%
Labour Co-op	Sharon Hofman*	870	32.5	−23.6
Liberal Democrats	Darius Kirtiklis	800	29.9	4.2
Reform	Craig Gadd	732	27.3	27.3
Green	Daniel Montgomery	218	8.1	4.4
Conservative	Matilda Sargeson	59	2.2	−12.9
Majority		70	2.6	
Rejected ballots		5		
Turnout		2,685	44.0	
Labour hold		Swing	-13.9	

=== Central ===
Central
Party	Candidate	Votes	%	±%
Liberal Democrats	Motokin Ali	567	31.3	4.8
Labour	Sharon Kassim*	515	28.4	−24.6
Reform	Muhammad Ayub	420	23.2	23.2
Green	Salman Malik	243	13.4	13.4
Conservative	Simon Trow	66	3.6	−3.9
Majority		52	2.9	
Rejected ballots		4		
Turnout		1,815	28.1	
Liberal Democrats gain from Labour		Swing	-8.3	

=== Derringham ===
Derringham
Party	Candidate	Votes	%	±%
Reform	Martin Baker	1,157	40.7	40.7
Liberal Democrats	Jan Mitchell	1,014	35.6	−6.1
Labour Co-op	Jake Croft	387	13.6	−36.5
Green	John Allison-Walsh	225	7.9	4.1
Conservative	Michael Whitehead	63	2.2	−2.1
Majority		143	5.1	
Rejected ballots		4		
Turnout		2,850	31.7	
Reform gain from Liberal Democrats		Swing	23.4	

=== Drypool ===
Drypool
Party	Candidate	Votes	%	±%
Liberal Democrats	Linda Chambers*	1,339	45.7	−17.5
Reform	Benjamin RFuller	966	33.0	33.0
Green	Tee Coiffait	344	11.7	5.8
Labour	Millie Wood	221	7.6	−17.6
Conservative	Terry Justice	44	1.5	−4.2
TUSC	Michael Hirst	15	0.5	0.5
Majority		373	12.7	
Rejected ballots		6		
Turnout		2,936	34.0	
Liberal Democrats hold		Swing	-25.3	

=== Holderness ===
Holderness
Party	Candidate	Votes	%	±%
Liberal Democrats	Jackie Dad*	1,465	45.5	−15.0
Reform	Mark Fox	1,159	36.0	36.0
Green	Deborah Prescott	300	9.3	9.3
Labour	James Richardson	235	7.3	−23.2
Conservative	Mary Justice	59	1.8	−2.5
Majority		306	9.5	
Rejected ballots		2		
Turnout		3,220	36.8	
Liberal Democrats hold		Swing	-25.5	

=== Longhill and Bilton Grange ===
Longhill and Bilton Grange
Party	Candidate	Votes	%	±%
Reform	Aaron Pickering	1,100	49.6	49.6
Labour	Jan Hornby	455	20.5	−18.6
Liberal Democrats	Tim Kemp*	409	18.4	−34.1
Green	Sarah Scriven	182	8.2	8.2
Conservative	Geoffrey Horton	71	3.2	−1.6
Majority		645	29.1	
Rejected ballots		5		
Turnout		2,222	26.0	
Reform gain from Liberal Democrats		Swing	34.11	

=== Marfleet ===
Marfleet
Party	Candidate	Votes	%	±%
Reform	Duncan Graham	1,021	52.3	52.3
Labour	Shaune Clarkson	366	18.7	−52.3
Green	Ryan Mulcahy	321	16.4	16.4
Liberal Democrats	Luna Bourke	185	9.5	−10.1
Conservative	Jackie Williams	60	3.1	−6.4
Majority		655	33.6	
Rejected ballots		5		
Turnout		1,959	21.2	
Reform gain from Labour		Swing	52.3	

=== Newington and Gipsyville ===
Newington and Gipsyville
Party	Candidate	Votes	%	±%
Reform	Lisa Graham	1,050	40.7	40.7
Labour	Simon Kelsey	768	29.8	−36.2
Liberal Democrats	Taiye Fatoki	367	14.3	−8.6
Green	Christopher Jackson	316	12.3	12.3
Conservative	James Sargeant	77	3.0	−8.2
Majority		282	10.9	
Rejected ballots		12		
Turnout		2,590	25.1	
Reform gain from Labour		Swing	38.5	

=== North Carr ===
North Carr
Party	Candidate	Votes	%	±%
Reform	Deborah Carnall	1,098	51.7	38.8
Labour	Anita Harrison*	400	18.8	−23.5
Liberal Democrats	Damian Grimley	315	14.8	−26.3
Green	Alex Gibb	251	11.8	11.8
Conservative	Sam Nattress	60	2.8	−0.9
Majority		698	32.9	
Rejected ballots		9		
Turnout		2,125	20.6	
Reform gain from Labour		Swing	31.2	

=== Orchard Park ===
Orchard Park
Party	Candidate	Votes	%	±%
Reform	Neil Fletcher	954	45.4	45.4
Labour	Tony Wood	530	25.2	−37.2
Liberal Democrats	Jacob Bishop	260	12.4	−7.9
Green	Amazon Jackson	194	9.2	9.2
Independent	John Gilling	97	4.6	−5.6
Conservative	Sandra Vennoyer	68	3.2	−3.6
Majority		424	20.2	
Rejected ballots		6		
Turnout		2,104	21.0	
Reform gain from Labour		Swing	41.3	

=== Pickering ===
Pickering
Party	Candidate	Votes	%	±%
Liberal Democrats	Tracey Henry*	832	41.1	−16.8
Reform	Brendan Dobbs	816	40.3	40.3
Labour	Terry Sullivan	226	11.2	−27.2
Green	Caitlin Whyatt	122	6.0	6.0
Conservative	Bethany Spencer	31	1.5	−2.3
Majority		16	0.8	
Rejected ballots		4		
Turnout		2,031	33.6	
Liberal Democrats hold		Swing	-28.5	

=== Southcoates ===
Southcoates
Party	Candidate	Votes	%	±%
Reform	Richard Kelly	1,179	43.1	28.0
Labour	Anna Thompson*	943	34.5	−31.9
Green	Duncan Woods	305	11.2	11.2
Liberal Democrats	Mark Adams	195	7.1	−5.6
Conservative	Christine MacKay	68	2.5	−3.4
Independent	Ian Broadbent	46	1.7	1.7
Majority		236	8.6	
Rejected ballots		1		
Turnout		2,738	27.8	
Reform gain from Labour		Swing	29.9	

=== St Andrews and Docklands ===
St Andrews and Docklands
Party	Candidate	Votes	%	±%
Reform	Salman Anwar	836	33.3	33.3
Labour Co-op	Leanne Fudge*	824	32.8	−34.7
Green	Connor De Lisle	499	19.9	19.9
Liberal Democrats	Josh Harris	246	9.8	−9.2
Conservative	Daniel Bond	67	2.7	−4.5
TUSC	Paul Spooner	22	0.9	0.9
National Rebirth Party	Barry McGrath	19	0.8	0.8
Majority		12	0.5	
Rejected ballots		10		
Turnout		2,523	24.2	
Reform gain from Labour		Swing	34.0	

=== Sutton ===
Sutton
Party	Candidate	Votes	%	±%
Reform	Simon Taylor	1,295	39.2	39.2
Liberal Democrats	Terry Keal*	1,252	37.9	−23.7
Green	David Prescott	434	13.1	13.1
Labour	Harriet Barker	232	7.0	−25.1
Conservative	Frankie Williams	94	2.8	3.6
Majority		43	1.3	
Rejected ballots		13		
Turnout		3,322	34.0	
Reform gain from Liberal Democrats		Swing	31.4	

=== University ===
University
Party	Candidate	Votes	%	±%
Liberal Democrats	Laura Juskey	712	39.1	−8.8
Reform	Stuart Dean	547	30.1	+30.1
Green	Jamie Strudwick	269	14.8	+8.9
Labour	Ebenezer Aniemeka	247	13.6	−28.9
Conservative	Ben Lavender	45	2.5	+2.5
Majority		165	9.1	
Rejected ballots		3		
Turnout		1,821	30.4	
Liberal Democrats hold		Swing	-0.04	

=== West Carr ===
West Carr
Party	Candidate	Votes	%	±%
Reform	Ben Padwick	1,093	44.5	44.5
Liberal Democrats	Rob Pritchard*	944	38.4	−17.3
Labour	Finn Anderson	204	8.3	−23
Green	Drew Tuffs	162	6.6	6.6
Conservative	Kevin Druce	54	2.2	−4.4
Majority		149	6.1	
Rejected ballots		9		
Turnout		2,466	27.8	
Reform gain from Liberal Democrats		Swing	31.4	
