= Peter Hagger =

British trade unionist

Peter Hagger (17 April 1944 – 26 February 1995) was a British trade unionist.

Born in London, Hagger became a computer engineer, but in 1969 instead became a taxi driver. He joined the Transport and General Workers' Union (TGWU), becoming prominent in its Cab Section. By the end of the 1970s, he was Chair of the Region 1 Cab Trade Committee, and in 1980 he was elected to the union's General Executive Council. In this role, he devised an index which was later adopted by the Department of Transport to calculate annual increases in taxi fares. During his time at the T&G he also wrote a document called a National Framework for Taxis, which was referred to in the parliamentary debate around the Private Hire Vehicles (London) Act 1998.

Hagger was a member of the Communist Party of Great Britain, then of the Communist Campaign Group, and its successor, the Communist Party of Britain.

Hagger won election to the General Council of the Trades Union Congress (TUC), and in 1989 was elected as chair of the Trades Union Councils Joint Consultative Committee. He was also elected as vice-chair of the TGWU, and was expected to become the union's next chair. However, he became ill, and died in 1995. In his obituary, Barry Camfield described Hagger as "the most influential lay trade-union activist in Britain".

Trade union offices
Preceded by Brian Nicholson	Chair of the Trades Councils' Joint Consultative Committee; 1989–1995	Succeeded by Rita Donaghy
