= Edgar Fryer =

British trade unionist

Edgar Edmund Fryer (1893 or 1894 – 5 June 1964) was a British trade unionist, who served as the chairman of the Transport and General Workers' Union.

Fryer worked for many years for the Bristol Omnibus Company as a coach driver, and joined the Transport and General Workers' Union in the mid-1920s. In 1941, he was elected to the union's national executive council, and then in 1948 was elected as the union's chair. He served in this role until his retirement, in 1959.

Following Fryer's retirement, the Bristol Bus Boycott highlighted the role of the local TGWU in enforcing a colour bar on workers at the Bristol Omnibus Company. He died in 1964.

Trade union offices
Preceded by Harry Edwards	Chairman of the Transport and General Workers' Union; 1948–1959	Succeeded by Len Forden
