= Daniel Duffy =

Scottish trade unionist

Daniel Duffy (3 October 1929 – 16 March 2004) was a Scottish trade unionist, who served as chair of the Transport and General Workers' Union, and on the General Council of the Trades Union Congress.

Duffy grew up in Glasgow, and attended St Mungo's Academy. In 1947, he began working as a driver, and he joined the Scottish Horse and Motormen's Association. He gradually rose to prominence in the union, winning election to its executive council in 1960, and serving as the union's president from 1969.

In 1971, the Scottish Motormen became part of the Transport and General Workers' Union (TGWU), and Duffy was elected to the TGWU's executive council. In 1988, he was elected as the chair of the TGWU, and that year he also won election to the General Council of the Trades Union Congress. In 1992, he stood down from the General Council, and instead won election to the National Executive Committee of the Labour Party. He retired from all his posts in 1996.

Trade union offices
Preceded by Brian Nicholson	Chair of the Transport and General Workers' Union; 1988–1996	Succeeded by Andy Smith
