= Henry Edwards =

Henry Edwards may refer to:

- Henry W. Edwards (1779–1847), U.S. representative, U.S. senator, and governor of Connecticut
- Sir Henry Edwards, 1st Baronet (1812–1886), British Conservative MP for Halifax, 1847–1852, and Beverley, 1857–1870
- Sir Henry Edwards (1820–1897), British Liberal MP for Weymouth and Melcombe Regis, 1867–1885
- Henry Sutherland Edwards (1828–1906), British journalist
- Henry Edwards (entomologist) (1827–1891), English-born actor, writer and insect scientist
- Henry Edwards (priest) (1837–1884), Welsh Anglican Dean of Bangor
- Henry Edwards (footballer) (1856–1913), Wrexham F.C. and Wales international footballer
- Henry Edwards (actor) (1882–1952), English actor and film director
- Henry Edwards (cricketer) (1861–1921), English cricketer
- F. Henry Edwards (1897–1991), British leader in the Reorganized Church of Jesus Christ of Latter Day Saints
- Henry William John Edwards (1910–1991), Welsh author

== See also ==
- Harry Edwards (disambiguation)
