= Stan Pemberton =

British trade unionist

Stanley Pemberton (1921 – November 1999) was a British trade unionist, who served as chair of the Transport and General Workers' Union.

Born on Merseyside, Pemberton left school in 1936 and immediately found work at the Dunlop Rubber factory in Speke. He joined the Transport and General Workers' Union (TGWU), and became a shop steward in the 1950s, and in about 1960 was elected to the union's executive committee. In 1974, he was elected to the General Council of the Trades Union Congress (TUC), and he additionally served on the TUC's Education, Employment Policy, and Trades Councils committees.

Pemberton was elected as chairman of the TGWU in 1976. Despite all his work for the union, Pemberton continued to work at Dunlop, until it closed its factory in the early 1980s and he was made redundant. He stood down from his union posts in 1982. In retirement, he became a director of the Mersey Docks and Harbour Company.

Trade union offices
| Preceded by Len Forden | Chairman of the Transport and General Workers' Union; 1976–1982 | Succeeded by Walter Greendale |
