= Len Forden =

British trade unionist (1910–1977)

Leonard Forden (1910 – 5 March 1977) was a British trade unionist. He served on both the General Council of the Trades Union Congress and the National Executive Committee of the Labour Party.

Forden worked for many years as a bus driver in Manchester. He joined the Transport and General Workers' Union (TGWU) in 1924, and became secretary of his union branch in 1943. In 1949, he was elected to the General Executive Council of the TGWU, and he served as vice-chairman and then, from 1960, as chairman of the council and president of the union.

In 1958, Forden was elected to the General Council of the Trades Union Congress (TUC), despite still working on the buses, it being a tradition of the TGWU that one their nominees would not work full time for the union. He served until 1964, when he agreed to stand down, in order that Frank Cousins could take his place. He instead won election to the General Purposes Committee of the TUC.

Forden was elected to the National Executive Committee of the Labour Party in 1968, replacing Harry Nicholas, who had been appointed as General Secretary of the Labour Party. While on the body, he chaired the party's Staff Negotiations Committee.

Forden also served as a delegate to the International Transport Workers' Federation and the Manchester and Salford Trades Council. From 1960, he served on the National Advisory Council on the Employment of the Disabled. In his spare time, he was a magistrate.

Forden retired from his posts in 1975, and died two years later.

Trade union offices
Preceded by Edgar Fryer	President of the Transport and General Workers' Union; 1960–1975	Succeeded by Stan Pemberton
