= Harold Edwards =

Harold Edwards may refer to:

- Harold Edwards (mathematician) (1936–2020), American mathematician
- Harold Edwards (RCAF officer) (1892–1952), Canadian Air Force officer
- Harold Edwards (rugby league) (1909–1993), Welsh rugby league footballer
- Harold C. Edwards (1899–1989), British surgeon
- Harold Leslie Edwards (1893–1951), Canadian World War I flying ace

== See also ==
- Harry Edwards (disambiguation)
