= Brian Nicholson =

British trade unionist (1933–2018)

Brian Gerald Nicholson (9 May 1933 – 20 January 2018) was a British trade unionist.

Nicholson grew up in the East End of London, and worked as a docker. He joined the Transport and General Workers' Union (TGWU), and by 1968 was a member of the executive of its No.1 Docks Group. In this role, he was a vocal opponent of racism and fascism, speaking out in particular against the support of some dockers for Enoch Powell. This theme was prominent in his 1974 pamphlet, Racialism, Fascism and the Trade Unions. By 1972, Nicholson was a member of TGWU's executive, regarded as being on the left wing of the union, and a vice-chair of the Institute for Workers' Control.

In 1975, Nicholson advocated industrial action against containerisation at Tilbury Docks. A strike took place, but it was poorly organised and supported, and after unions members voted to return to work without gaining any concessions, Nicholson accepted the decision. During the strike, Nicholson secretly passed information on union tactics to MI5. This was revealed in 2001, at which time Nicholson claimed that he was playing games with the secret service, and only told them things which were not significant.

By 1978, he chaired the joint union committee for the London Docks, and had become more cautious about strike action.

In 1982, Nicholson stood to become the chairman of the TGWU, but was defeated by a more left-wing docker, Walter Greendale, instead becoming deputy chairman. In 1983, the TGWU was given five automatic seats on the General Council of the Trades Union Congress, and Nicholson was appointed to one of them.

Four years later, Greendale was defeated for re-election to the union's executive, and therefore could no longer serve as chair. On this occasion, Nicholson won election to the post, defeating the more left-wing Daniel Duffy.

In 1988, Nicholson was up for re-election to the TGWU executive, but was beaten into third place, with the militant Steve Riley winning the post. Nicholson's supporters claimed that Riley's membership payments were in arrears and so he should be disqualified, but this argument was rejected. Nicholson stood again for the executive in 1990, but was beaten by three other candidates.

Nicholson was involved in a 1989 against the abolition of the National Dock Labour Board, following which he was sacked. An industrial tribunal found that he and 18 other union activists had been unlawfully dismissed, and were entitled to compensation, but they were not re-employed. He instead began running a club for retired dockers, in East London.

On 1 January 2001 The Guardian published an article about Brian Nicholson and his relationship with MI5 under the title "Dockers' leader passed strike tactics to MI5 agents......." and steve Turner of Unite The Union wrote on 5 August 2020 "Phone taps, mail intercepts and undercover ‘plants’ inside our movement were all utilised in the attack on our unions and class. This included the ‘recruitment’ of the soon-to-be chair of the executive council of the Transport and General Workers’ Union itself. Brian Nicholson, a docker, was subsequently ‘exposed’ as an agent of the state (MI5) working at the heart of the TGWU, the dockers’ own union. I’ve got no doubt that today’s Brians are being groomed for office by those same organisations – who never changed their view that our unions represented an ‘enemy within.’"

Trade union offices
Preceded by Walter Greendale	Chairman of the Transport and General Workers' Union; 1986–1988	Succeeded by Daniel Duffy
Preceded by Doug Grieve	Chair of the Trades Councils' Joint Consultative Committee; 1986–1988	Succeeded by Peter Hagger
