= Municipal Association Group =

Municipal political party in Hull, England

The Municipal Association Group (known as MAG, and as the Hull Municipal Association) was a municipal political party in Kingston upon Hull, England, which existed from 1934 to 1963.

The Labour Party won control of Hull Corporation in 1934. In the same year the Municipal Association was established 'to combat socialist domination', advertising against 'socialist (mis)rule'. The Association grew out of the former "Independent Group", and included both Liberals and Conservatives. In the early years there was a tendency to refer to the association as the "Hull Municipal Association (1934)".

In 1938, together with Independents, the Municipal Association won control, retaining it until 1945. Towards the end of its existence, the Municipal Association was largely Conservative-dominated and from 1960 Liberal candidates stood separately from the MAG. In 1963 the rupture between Liberals and Conservatives became permanent, and the Association merged into the Hull Conservative Federation.
