= Harry Edwards (trade unionist) =

British trade union leader (1874–1958)

Harry James Edwards (1874 – 19 January 1958) was a British trade union leader.

== Biography ==
Born in Guisborough, North Yorkshire, Edwards became an ironstone miner, then worked on the trams and in the shipyard, before moving to become a stevedore. In 1897, he joined the Dock, Wharf, Riverside and General Labourers' Union (DWRGU). In 1911, he was elected to the union's executive, representing his district, and also served as branch secretary.

In 1922, the DWRGU became part of the new Transport and General Workers' Union. Edwards was elected to its executive, representing Area No 8, and then in 1934 was elected as the union's chairman. He served until his retirement, in 1947. That year, he was awarded the Gold Medal of the Trades Union Congress. He remained secretary of his union branch until 1955.

Trade union offices
Preceded by Herbert Kershaw	Chairman of the Transport and General Workers' Union; 1934–1947	Succeeded by Edgar Fryer
