= Hull City Council =

Local government body in England

Kingston upon Hull City Council

Type
- Type: Unitary authority

Leadership
- Lord Mayor: Maria Coward, Liberal Democrat since 21 May 2026
- Leader: Mike Ross, Liberal Democrat since 19 May 2022
- Chief Executive: Matt Jukes since 1 November 2015

Structure
- Seats: 57 Councillors
- Graph of the party split among 57 seats.
- Political groups: Administration (25) Liberal Democrats (25) Other parties (32) Labour (16) Reform (10) Independent (6)

Elections
- Voting system: First past the post
- Last election: 7 May 2026
- Next election: 6 May 2027

Meeting place
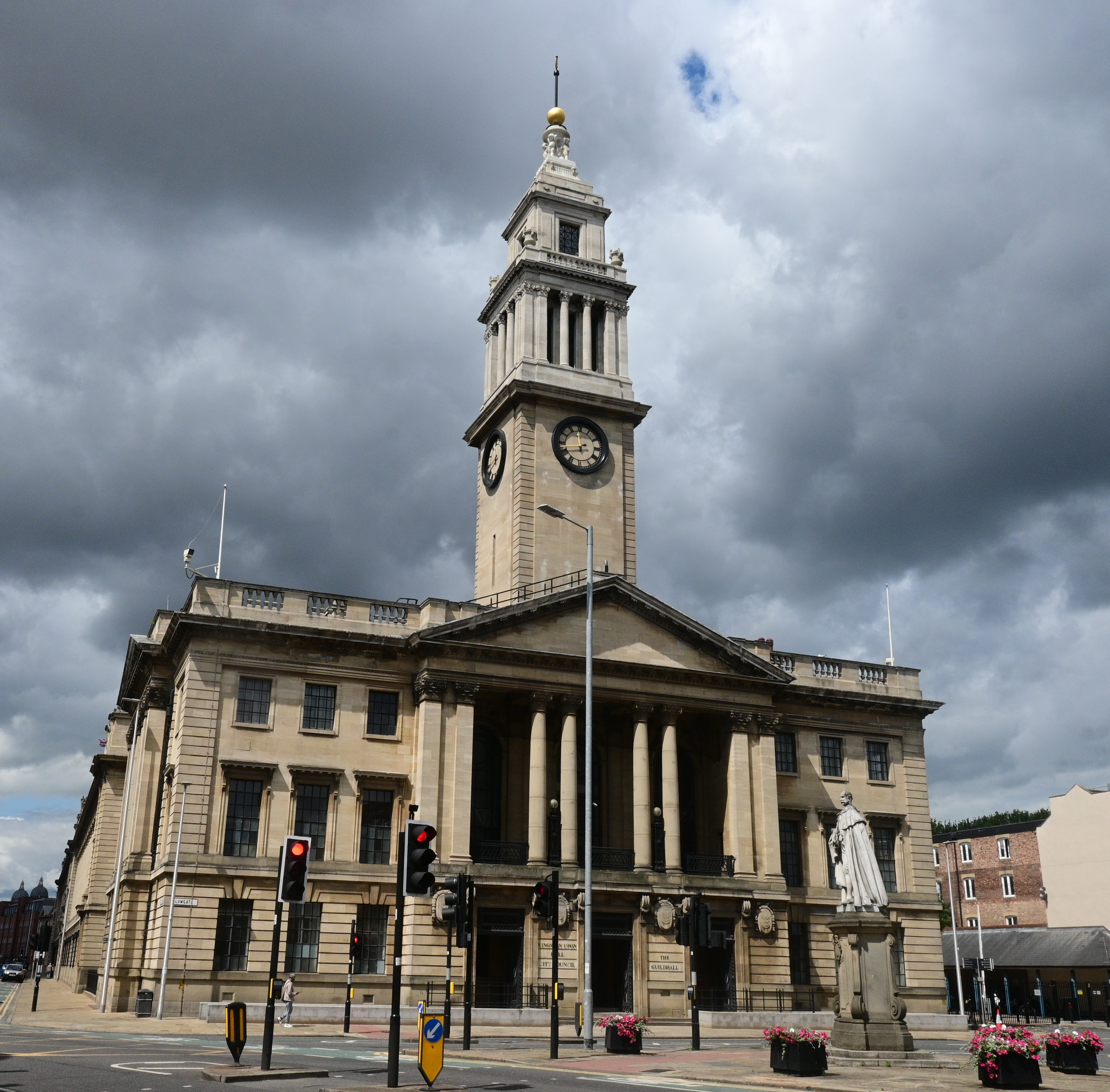
- The Guildhall, Alfred Gelder Street, Hull, HU1 2AA

Website
- www.hull.gov.uk

Hull City Council, or Kingston upon Hull City Council, is the local authority for the city of Kingston upon Hull (generally known as Hull) in the ceremonial county of the East Riding of Yorkshire, England. Hull has had a council since 1299, which has been reformed on numerous occasions. Since 1996 the council has been a unitary authority, being a district council which also performs the functions of a county council; it is independent from East Riding of Yorkshire Council, the unitary authority which administers the rest of the county.

The council meets at the Guildhall. It has been under no overall control since the 2026 election. The Liberal Democrats are the largest party and run the council as a minority administration.

== History ==
Hull was an ancient borough. It was granted its first charter in 1299 by Edward I. He had acquired the small port town of Wyke upon Hull six years earlier in 1293, and had renamed it Kingston upon Hull to reflect its new royal ownership. The 1299 charter gave the borough certain rights of self-government. A subsequent charter in 1331 gave the borough the right to appoint a mayor.

In 1440 the borough was given the right to appoint its own sheriff, which made it a county corporate and removed it from the jurisdiction of the Sheriff of Yorkshire. Seven years later, in 1447, the county corporate was extended to also include an adjoining rural area lying to the west of Hull itself, which became known as Hullshire. Although independent from the Sheriff of Yorkshire, Hull remained part of the geographical county of Yorkshire and continued to form part of the East Riding for the purposes of lieutenancy until 1974.

Hull was reformed in 1836 to become a municipal borough under the Municipal Corporations Act 1835, which standardised how most boroughs operated across the country. The town was then governed by a body formally called the 'mayor, aldermen and burgesses of the borough of Kingston upon Hull', generally known as the corporation or town council. The reformed borough was enlarged to match the Kingston upon Hull constituency, which had been expanded in 1832 to take in areas including Drypool and Sculcoates. As part of the same reforms, Hull lost its jurisdiction over the parts of Hullshire outside the enlarged borough boundary (the parishes of Hessle, Kirk Ella and North Ferriby and their associated townships), which were returned to the jurisdiction of the Sheriff of Yorkshire.

When elected county councils were established in 1889, Hull was considered large enough for the existing corporation to also take on county council functions, making it a county borough. The borough boundaries were enlarged on several occasions.

In 1897, Hull was awarded city status, after which the corporation was also known as the city council. In 1914 the city's mayor was awarded the honorific title of lord mayor.

Local government was reformed in 1974 under the Local Government Act 1972. Hull kept the same boundaries (which had last been expanded in 1968) but was reconstituted as a non-metropolitan district and placed in the new county of Humberside, with county-level functions passing to Humberside County Council. Hull's borough and city statuses and its lord mayoralty were all transferred to the new district and its council.

The legal name of the district is 'Kingston upon Hull', but the council styles itself 'Hull City Council' rather than its full formal name of 'Kingston upon Hull City Council'. The full name is sometimes used in official documents.

In 1996 the county of Humberside and its council were abolished, and Hull City Council gained responsibility for county-level services. The way this change was legally implemented was to create a new non-metropolitan county of Kingston upon Hull covering the same area as the existing district, but with no separate county council; instead the existing city council took on county functions, making it a unitary authority. This therefore had the effect of restoring the city council to the powers it had held when Hull was a county borough prior to 1974. A ceremonial county called East Riding of Yorkshire was established at the same time, covering both Hull and the neighbouring East Riding of Yorkshire unitary authority area.

The council became a member of the new Hull and East Yorkshire Combined Authority in 2025, which is chaired by the directly elected Mayor of Hull and East Yorkshire.

== Governance ==
The council provides both district-level and county-level functions. There are no civil parishes in the city.

=== Political control ===
The council went under no overall control at the 2026 election. The Liberal Democrats are the largest party, and run the council as a minority administration.

Political control of the council since 1929 has been as follows:

| Party in control | Years |
|---|---|
| Labour | 1929–1930 |
| Independent | 1930–1934 |
| Labour | 1934–1938 |
| Municipal Association Group | 1938–1945 |
| Labour | 1945–1969 |
| Conservative | 1969–1971 |
| Labour | 1971–2002 |
| No overall control | 2002–2007 |
| Liberal Democrats | 2007–2011 |
| Labour | 2011–2022 |
| Liberal Democrats | 2022–2026 |
| No overall control | 2026–present |

=== Leadership ===
The role of Lord Mayor is largely ceremonial. Political leadership is provided by the leader of the council. The leaders since 1945 have been:

| Councillor | Party | From | To |
|---|---|---|---|
| Leo Schultz | Labour | 1945 | May 1969 |
| Rupert Alec-Smith | Conservative | 22 May 1969 | May 1970 |
| Archibald Dixon | Conservative | May 1970 | May 1971 |
| Leo Schultz | Labour | May 1971 | May 1979 |
| Pat Doyle | Labour | May 1979 | 2001 |
| Ken Branson | Labour | 2001 | 2002 |
| Simone Butterworth | Liberal Democrats | 2002 | 2003 |
| Colin Inglis | Labour | 2003 | May 2005 |
| Ken Branson | Labour | May 2005 | May 2006 |
| Carl Minns | Liberal Democrats | May2006 | May 2011 |
| Steve Brady | Labour | 19 May 2011 | May 2021 |
| Daren Hale | Labour | 20 May 2021 | May 2022 |
| Mike Ross | Liberal Democrats | 19 May 2022 | |

=== Composition ===
Following the 2026 election, and a subsequent change of allegiance in August 2026, the composition of the council was:

| Party | Seats |
|---|---|
| Liberal Democrats | 25 |
| Labour | 16 |
| Reform | 10 |
| Independent | 6 |
| Total | 57 |

Three of the independent councillors sit together as the "Independent Group". The next election is due in May 2027.

== Elections ==
Since the last boundary changes in 2018, the council has comprised 57 councillors representing 21 wards, with each ward electing two or three councillors. Elections are held three years out of every four, with a third of the council elected each time for a four-year term of office.

== Premises ==
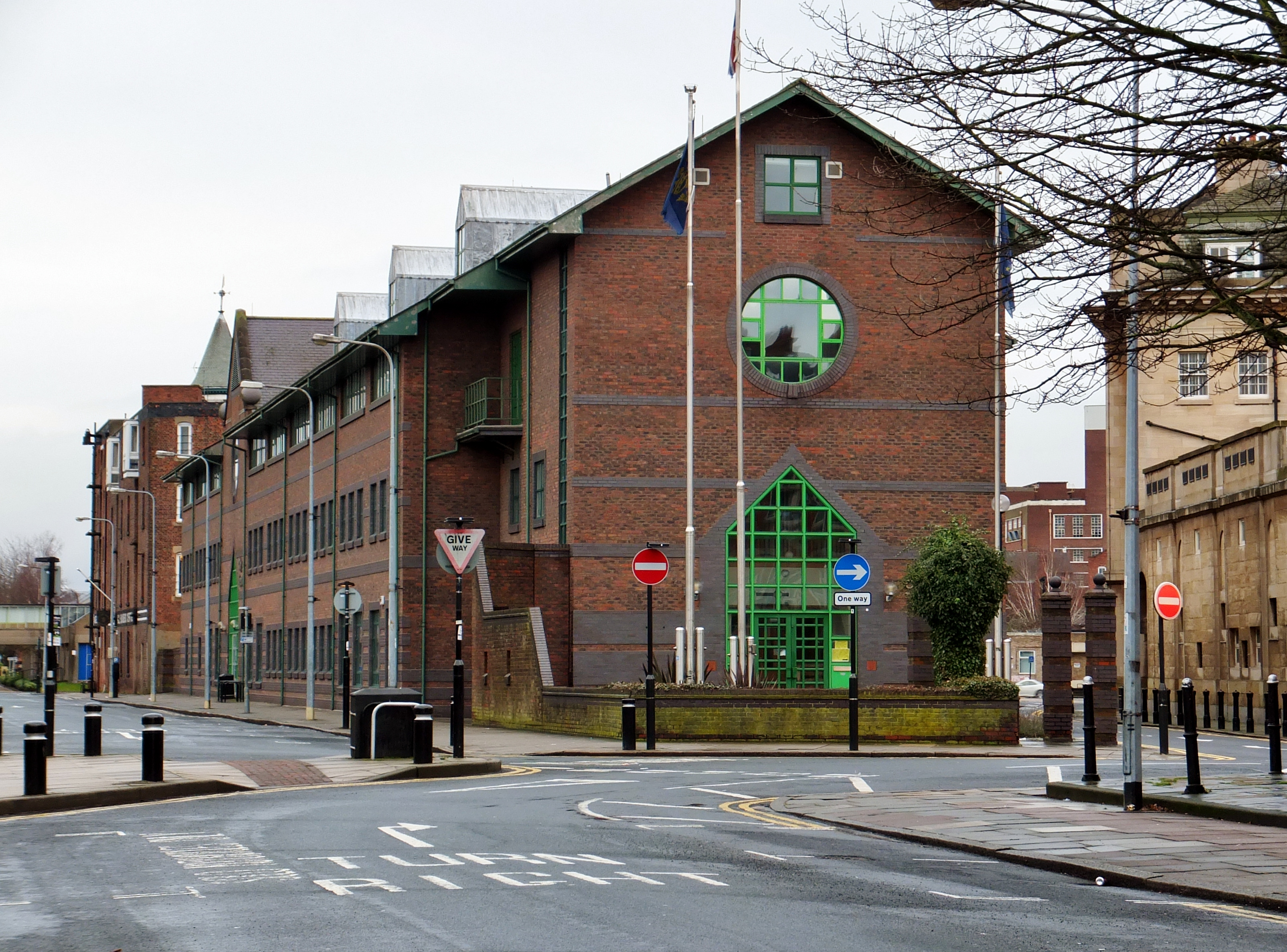
City Treasury, Guildhall Road

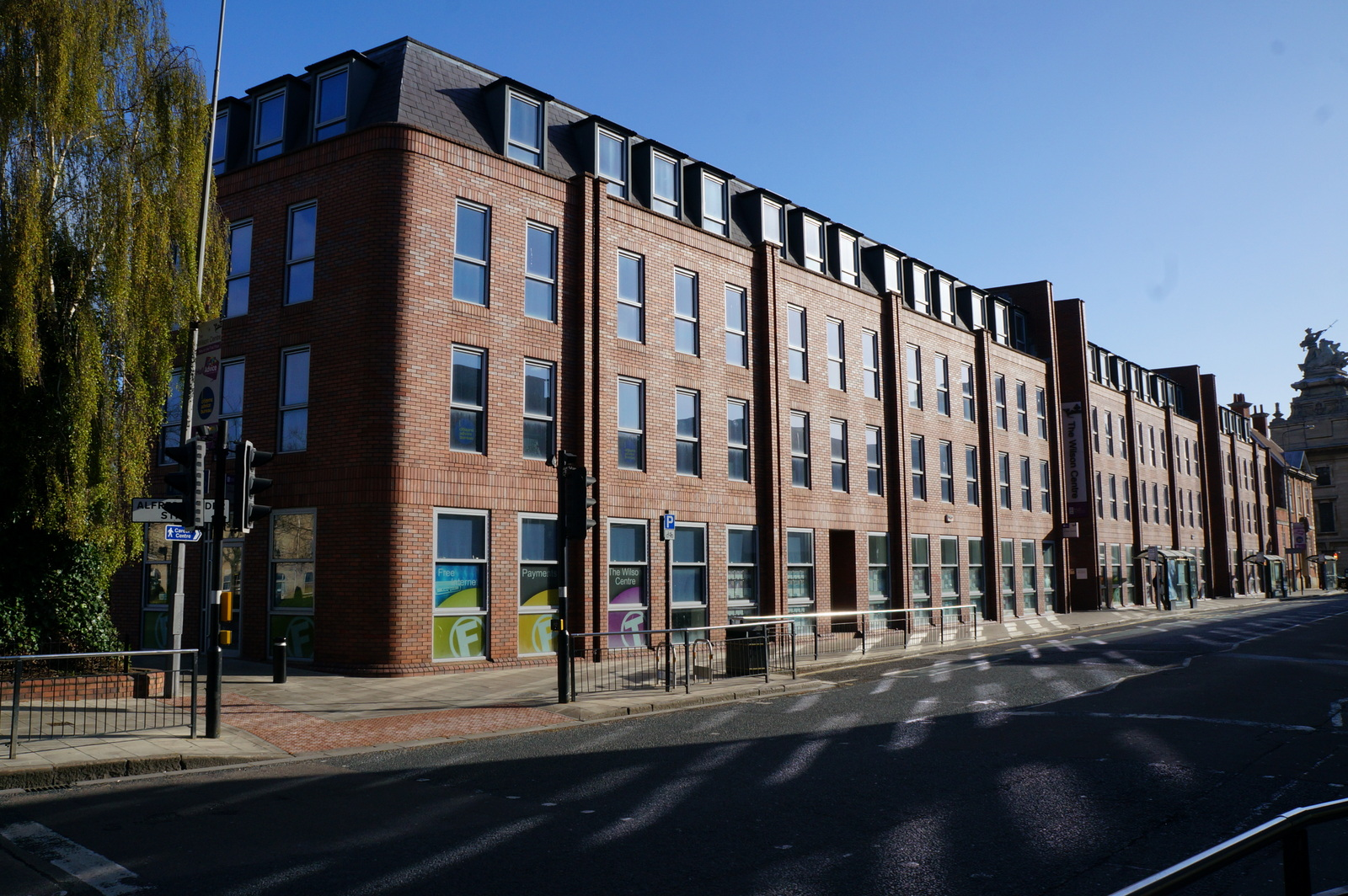
The Wilson Centre, Alfred Gelder Street

The council meets at the Guildhall at the junction of Alfred Gelder Street and Lowgate in the city centre. The building was purpose-built for the council and was completed in 1914. It has several other administrative buildings, including the Wilson Centre, also on Alfred Gelder Street (which houses the main customer service centre), and the City Treasury building on Guildhall Road, immediately north of the Guildhall.
