= Guildhall, Kingston upon Hull =

Municipal building in Hull, East Riding of Yorkshire, England

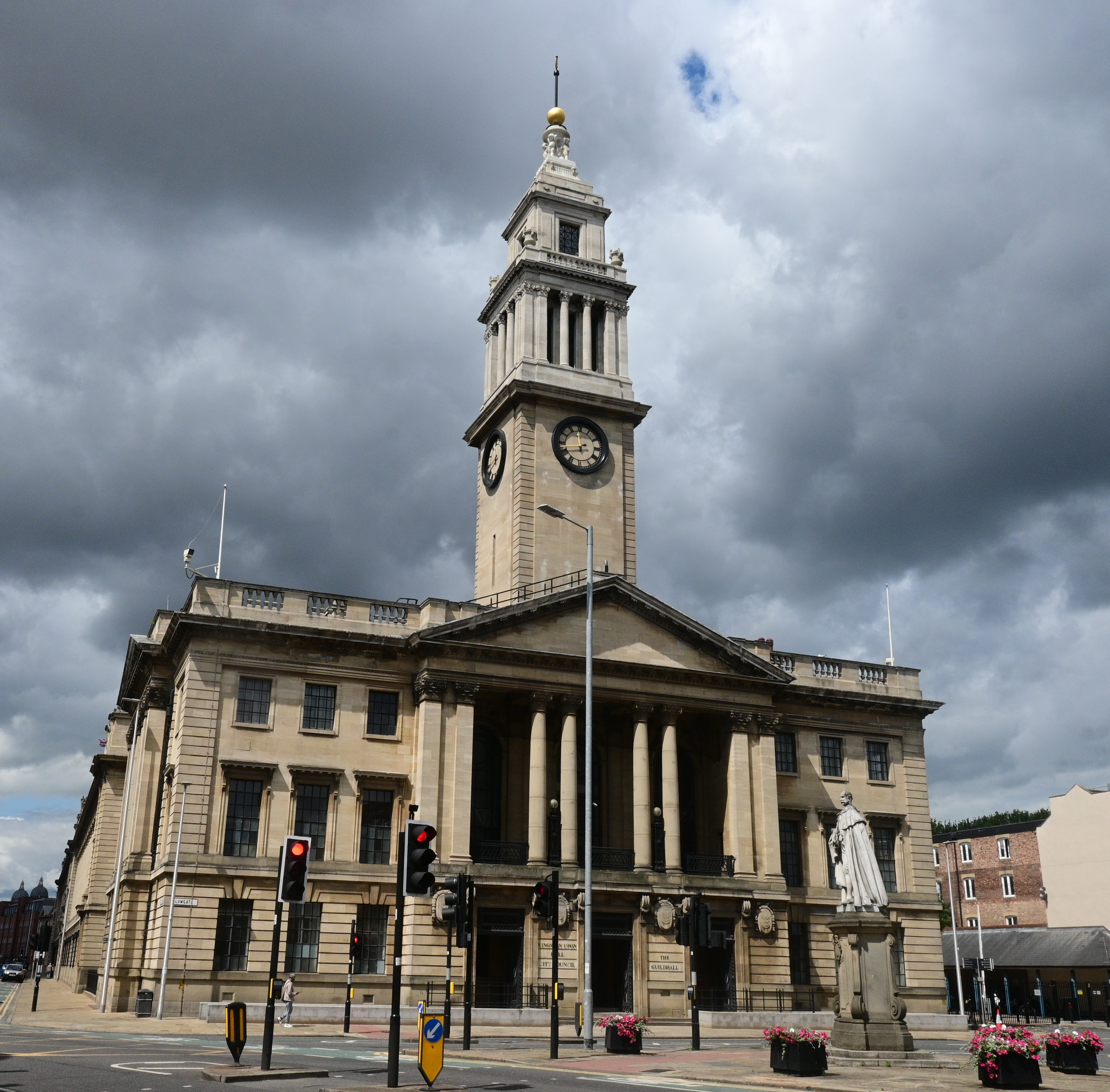
- The Lowgate frontage

- Location of Guildhall, Kingston upon Hull in the East Riding of Yorkshire
- 53.74443°N 0.33328°W
- Location: Kingston upon Hull, East Riding of Yorkshire

History
- Built: 1914

Site notes
- Architect: Sir Edwin Cooper

Listed Building – Grade II*
- Designated: 12 November 1973
- Reference no.: 1279708

The Guildhall is a building on Alfred Gelder Street in the City of Kingston upon Hull, East Riding of Yorkshire, England. The building is currently the headquarters of Hull City Council but is also used as a venue for conferences, civic receptions and formal dinners. It is a Grade II* listed building.

== History ==
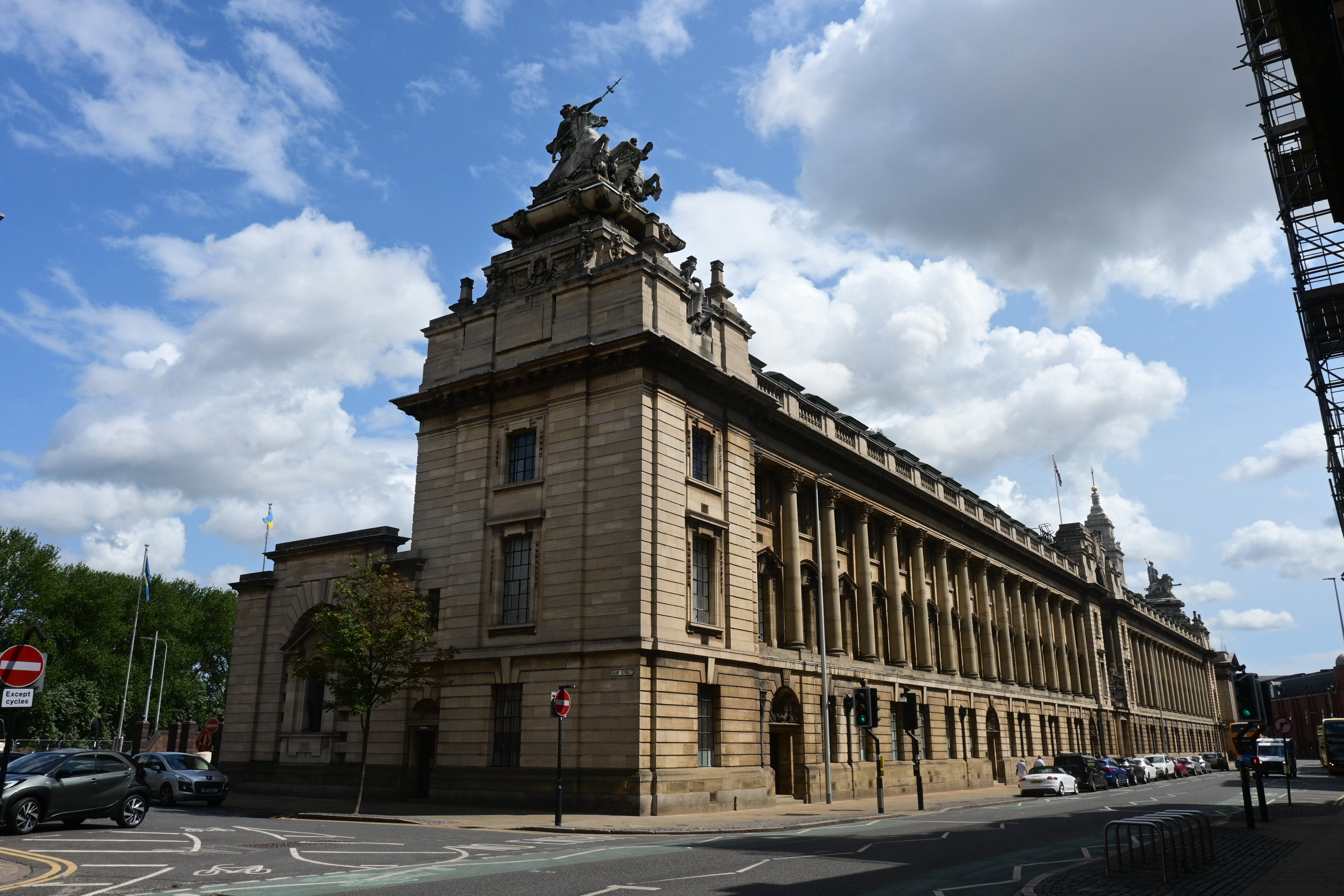
The Alfred Gelder Street frontage

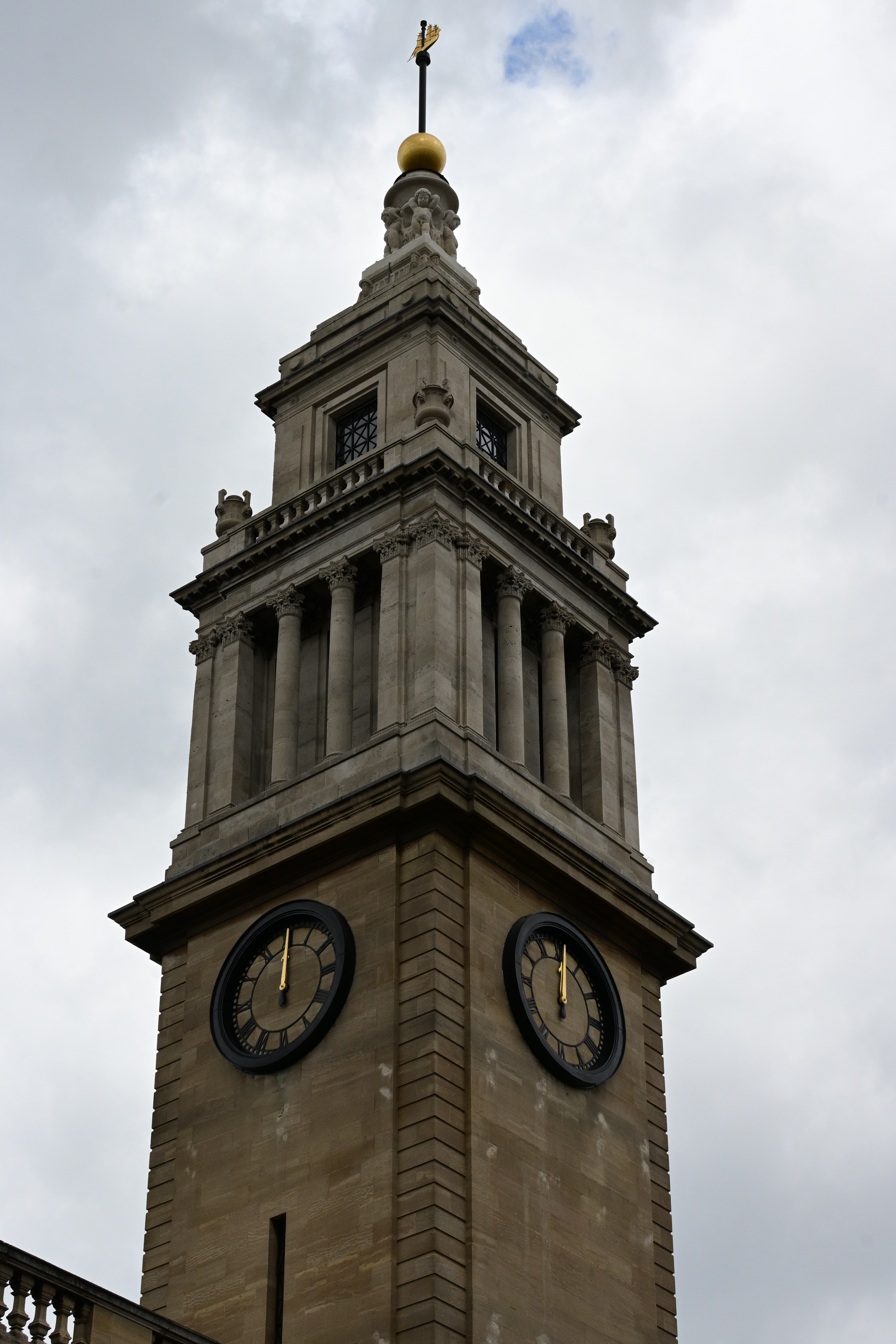
The clock tower, featuring the restored time ball on the top of the tower

A guildhall, which was located at the southern end of Market Place, was first mentioned when it hosted business between the Mayor and Aldermen in 1333. A second guildhall, at a height of two-storeys was built to the north of the first building during the 1630s. This guildhall was demolished to make way for Queen Street in 1805. The mayor then worked from a domestic property in Lower Street, which was first leased and then acquired, until a third guildhall was built to the designs of Cuthbert Brodrick in the Renaissance style on Alfred Gelder Street between 1862 and 1866.

The current guildhall, which was designed by Sir Edwin Cooper to accommodate the civic offices and law courts, was built by Quibell, Son & Green of Hull between 1906 and 1914. The eastern end of the current guildhall lies on the site of Brodrick's guildhall. The main frontage on Alfred Gelder Street was built with a central feature flanked by two long colonnades with pavilions at either end. Large sculptures by Albert Hodge, one of a female figure on a boat drawn by seahorses and the other of a figure in a chariot flanked by lions, were placed on each of the pavilions. A turret clock built by Cooke and Johnson of Hull (dated 1865) was transferred from Brodrick's guildhall to the new building.

A time ball, a mechanism which enables navigators aboard ships to verify the setting of their marine chronometers, was installed at the top of the clock tower when it was built. The guildhall time ball is believed to be the last to have been installed in the UK and also the highest to have been installed the UK. The building was damaged in bombing in May 1941 during the Hull Blitz of the Second World War.

The western end of the structure continued to serve as the location of the law courts for the city, until they moved to the new Kingston upon Hull Combined Court Centre in Lowgate in 1991.

A 23-bell carillon was added to the bell tower, which is 41 metres (135 ft) high, in 2004 and mechanised winding equipment for the clock was installed in 2013.

In 2016, the council launched an appeal seeking funds from the Heritage Lottery Fund and other donors to enable it to raise sufficient funds to restore the time ball. In October 2018 the Heritage Lottery Fund announced a contribution of £281,100 to the council's appeal. The restored time ball, coated in 23.5 carat gold leaf and weighing 50 kilograms (110 lb), was reinstalled on top of the clock tower in September 2021, and following renovation work on the Guildhall clock tower as well as the installation of a ship-shaped weather vane on top of the ball's pole, the restored time ball first dropped on 29 June 2023, the first time since its mechanism was removed in 1922.

== Inside the Guildhall ==
The main entrance to The Guildhall is from Lowgate. Inside the main entrance is the Grand Staircase, which sweeps up to the Civic Suite, Reception Room and Banqueting Hall. At the foot of the staircase is a statue of King Edward I, who granted the city's first charter in 1299. Works of art include a tapestry depicting 700 years of civic history and a painting by Terence Cuneo depicting the Departure of Queen Elizabeth II and the Duke of Edinburgh from the Corporation Pier, Kingston upon Hull, for a State Visit to Denmark.

== See also ==
- Grade II* listed buildings in the East Riding of Yorkshire
- Listed buildings in Kingston upon Hull (Myton Ward)
- Guild
- Guildhall
