= List of United Kingdom locations: Woof-Wy =

The United Kingdom

This is part of the list of United Kingdom locations: a gazetteer of place names in the United Kingdom showing each place's locality and geographical coordinates.

== Wo (continued) ==
=== Woof-Wool ===
Location	Locality	Coordinates (links to map & photo sources)	OS grid reference
Woofferton	Shropshire	52.30°N 02.72°W	SO5168
Wookey	Somerset	51.20°N 02.70°W	ST5145
Wookey Hole	Somerset	51.22°N 02.67°W	ST5347
Wool	Dorset	50.67°N 02.22°W	SY8486
Woolacombe	Devon	51.16°N 04.21°W	SS4543
Woolage Green	Kent	51.19°N 01.19°E	TR2349
Woolage Village	Kent	51.20°N 01.19°E	TR2350
Woolaston	Gloucestershire	51.68°N 02.60°W	ST5899
Woolaston Common	Gloucestershire	51.70°N 02.60°W	SO5801
Woolaston Slade	Gloucestershire	51.69°N 02.62°W	SO5700
Woolaston Woodside	Gloucestershire	51.69°N 02.62°W	SO5700
Woolavington	Somerset	51.16°N 02.94°W	ST3441
Woolbeding	West Sussex	50.99°N 00.76°W	SU8722
Wooldale	Kirklees	53.56°N 01.77°W	SE1508
Wooler	Northumberland	55.54°N 02.01°W	NT9928
Woolfall Heath	Knowsley	53.42°N 02.85°W	SJ4392
Woolfardisworthy	Devon	50.96°N 04.37°W	SS3321
Woolfardisworthy	Devon	50.85°N 03.67°W	SS8208
Woolfold	Bury	53.59°N 02.33°W	SD7811
Woolfords Cottages	South Lanarkshire	55.79°N 03.59°W	NT0057
Woolford's Water	Dorset	50.84°N 02.44°W	ST6905
Woolgarston	Dorset	50.62°N 02.02°W	SY9881
Woolgreaves	Wakefield	53.63°N 01.48°W	SE3416
Woolhampton	Berkshire	51.39°N 01.18°W	SU5766
Woolhope	Herefordshire	52.01°N 02.56°W	SO6135
Woolhope Cockshoot	Herefordshire	52.03°N 02.54°W	SO6337
Woolland	Dorset	50.85°N 02.32°W	ST7706
Woollard	Bath and North East Somerset	51.37°N 02.53°W	ST6364
Woollaston	Staffordshire	52.73°N 02.20°W	SJ8615
Woollaton	Devon	50.88°N 04.17°W	SS4712
Woollensbrook	Hertfordshire	51.77°N 00.03°W	TL3610
Woolley	Bath and North East Somerset	51.41°N 02.37°W	ST7468
Woolley	Cambridgeshire	52.35°N 00.31°W	TL1574
Woolley	Cornwall	50.91°N 04.49°W	SS2516
Woolley	Derbyshire	53.13°N 01.44°W	SK3760
Woolley	Wakefield	53.61°N 01.53°W	SE3113
Woolley	Wiltshire	51.34°N 02.24°W	ST8361
Woolley Bridge	Tameside	53.45°N 02.00°W	SK0095
Woolley Green	Berkshire	51.51°N 00.77°W	SU8580
Woolley Green	Wiltshire	51.34°N 02.24°W	ST8361
Woolmere Green	Worcestershire	52.25°N 02.06°W	SO9662
Woolmer Green	Hertfordshire	51.84°N 00.18°W	TL2518
Woolmer Hill	Surrey	51.09°N 00.75°W	SU8733
Woolmersdon	Somerset	51.09°N 03.02°W	ST2833
Woolminstone	Somerset	50.86°N 02.83°W	ST4108
Woolpack Corner	Kent	51.10°N 00.64°E	TQ8537
Woolpit	Suffolk	52.22°N 00.88°E	TL9762
Woolpit Green	Suffolk	52.21°N 00.88°E	TL9761
Woolpit Heath	Suffolk	52.21°N 00.89°E	TL9861
Woolridge	Gloucestershire	51.90°N 02.29°W	SO8023
Woolsbridge	Dorset	50.84°N 01.87°W	SU0905
Woolscott	Warwickshire	52.29°N 01.28°W	SP4967
Woolsery	Devon	50.96°N 04.37°W	SS3321
Woolsgrove	Devon	50.80°N 03.71°W	SS7902
Woolsington	Newcastle upon Tyne	55.01°N 01.70°W	NZ1969
Woolstanwood	Cheshire	53.09°N 02.49°W	SJ6755
Woolstaston	Shropshire	52.57°N 02.81°W	SO4598
Woolsthorpe by Belvoir	Lincolnshire	52.89°N 00.76°W	SK8334
Woolsthorpe-by-Colsterworth	Lincolnshire	52.80°N 00.63°W	SK9224
Woolston	Cheshire	53.39°N 02.54°W	SJ6489
Woolston	Cornwall	50.48°N 04.41°W	SX2968
Woolston	Devon	50.25°N 03.81°W	SX7141
Woolston (south Shropshire)	Shropshire	52.47°N 02.85°W	SO4287
Woolston (north Shropshire)	Shropshire	52.80°N 03.01°W	SJ3224
Woolston (North Cadbury)	Somerset	51.04°N 02.51°W	ST6427
Woolston (Bicknoller)	Somerset	51.14°N 03.30°W	ST0939
Woolston	City of Southampton	50.88°N 01.38°W	SU4310
Woolstone	Gloucestershire	51.96°N 02.05°W	SO9630
Woolstone	Milton Keynes	52.03°N 00.73°W	SP8738
Woolstone	Oxfordshire	51.58°N 01.58°W	SU2987
Woolston Green	Devon	50.48°N 03.73°W	SX7766
Woolton	Liverpool	53.36°N 02.87°W	SJ4286
Woolton Hill	Hampshire	51.34°N 01.39°W	SU4261
Woolvers Hill	North Somerset	51.33°N 02.89°W	ST3860
Woolverstone	Suffolk	51.99°N 01.17°E	TM1838
Woolverton	Somerset	51.27°N 02.30°W	ST7953
Woolwell	Devon	50.42°N 04.11°W	SX5061
Woolwich	Greenwich	51.49°N 00.05°E	TQ4379

=== Woon-Woot ===
Location	Locality	Coordinates (links to map & photo sources)	OS grid reference
Woon	Cornwall	50.39°N 04.81°W	SX0059
Woonton (Almeley)	Herefordshire	52.16°N 02.95°W	SO3552
Woonton (Laysters)	Herefordshire	52.25°N 02.67°W	SO5462
Wooperton	Northumberland	55.47°N 01.95°W	NU0320
Wooplaw	Scottish Borders	55.66°N 02.81°W	NT4942
Woore	Shropshire	52.97°N 02.40°W	SJ7342
Wooth	Dorset	50.75°N 02.75°W	SY4795
Wooton (Claverley)	Shropshire	52.49°N 02.35°W	SO7689
Wooton (Whitton)	Shropshire	52.35°N 02.63°W	SO5773
Wootten Green	Suffolk	52.30°N 01.26°E	TM2372
Wootton	Bedfordshire	52.09°N 00.54°W	TL0045
Wootton	Hampshire	50.78°N 01.66°W	SZ2498
Wootton (Almeley)	Herefordshire	52.16°N 02.99°W	SO3252
Wootton (Dormington)	Herefordshire	52.04°N 02.59°W	SO5939
Wootton	Isle of Wight	50.72°N 01.23°W	SZ5492
Wootton	Kent	51.17°N 01.17°E	TR2246
Wootton	North Lincolnshire	53.62°N 00.36°W	TA0816
Wootton	Northamptonshire	52.19°N 00.88°W	SP7656
Wootton (West Oxfordshire)	Oxfordshire	51.86°N 01.37°W	SP4319
Wootton (Vale of White Horse)	Oxfordshire	51.70°N 01.32°W	SP4701
Wootton (Onibury)	Shropshire	52.39°N 02.80°W	SO4578
Wootton (Oswestry Rural)	Shropshire	52.83°N 02.98°W	SJ3427
Wootton (East Staffordshire)	Staffordshire	53.00°N 01.85°W	SK1045
Wootton (Stafford)	Staffordshire	52.84°N 02.26°W	SJ8227
Wootton Bourne End	Bedfordshire	52.09°N 00.57°W	SP9845
Wootton Bridge	Isle of Wight	50.71°N 01.23°W	SZ5491
Wootton Broadmead	Bedfordshire	52.07°N 00.51°W	TL0243
Wootton Common	Isle of Wight	50.71°N 01.25°W	SZ5391
Wootton Courtenay	Somerset	51.17°N 03.53°W	SS9343
Wootton Fitzpaine	Dorset	50.75°N 02.90°W	SY3695
Wootton Green	Bedfordshire	52.07°N 00.55°W	SP9943
Wootton Green	Solihull	52.39°N 01.67°W	SP2278
Wootton Rivers	Wiltshire	51.36°N 01.72°W	SU1963
Woottons	Staffordshire	52.93°N 01.89°W	SK0738
Wootton St Lawrence	Hampshire	51.27°N 01.15°W	SU5953
Wootton Wawen	Warwickshire	52.26°N 01.78°W	SP1563

=== Wor-Wou ===
Location	Locality	Coordinates (links to map & photo sources)	OS grid reference
Worbarrow	Dorset	50.61°N 02.18°W	SY8779
Worcester	Worcestershire	52.19°N 02.22°W	SO8555
Worcester Park	Surrey	51.37°N 00.24°W	TQ2265
Wordsley	Dudley	52.48°N 02.17°W	SO8887
Wordwell	Suffolk	52.31°N 00.66°E	TL8272
Worfield	Shropshire	52.55°N 02.37°W	SO7595
Worgret	Dorset	50.67°N 02.14°W	SY9086
Workhouse Common	Norfolk	52.72°N 01.47°E	TG3520
Workhouse End	Bedfordshire	52.15°N 00.39°W	TL1052
Workhouse Green	Suffolk	51.99°N 00.76°E	TL9037
Workhouse Hill	Essex	51.94°N 00.89°E	TL9931
Workington	Cumbria	54.62°N 03.56°W	NX9927
Worksop	Nottinghamshire	53.30°N 01.13°W	SK5879
Worlaby (hamlet in Maidenwell parish)	Lincolnshire	53.26°N 00.01°W	TF3376
Worlaby (village and parish)	North Lincolnshire	53.60°N 00.47°W	TA0113
Worlds End	Hampshire	50.90°N 01.10°W	SU6312
Worlds End	Solihull	52.41°N 01.79°W	SP1480
World's End	Berkshire	51.48°N 01.31°W	SU4876
World's End	Buckinghamshire	51.77°N 00.76°W	SP8509
World's End	Enfield	51.64°N 00.10°W	TQ3196
World's End	Suffolk	52.15°N 00.90°E	TL9955
World's End	West Sussex	50.95°N 00.12°W	TQ3219
Worle	North Somerset	51.35°N 02.93°W	ST3562
Worlebury	North Somerset	51.35°N 02.96°W	ST3362
Worleston	Cheshire	53.10°N 02.52°W	SJ6556
Worley	Gloucestershire	51.68°N 02.23°W	ST8499
Worlingham	Suffolk	52.44°N 01.58°E	TM4489
Worlington	Devon	51.04°N 04.17°W	SS4830
Worlington	Suffolk	52.32°N 00.47°E	TL6973
Worlingworth	Suffolk	52.26°N 01.26°E	TM2368
Wormbridge	Herefordshire	51.97°N 02.84°W	SO4231
Wormbridge Common	Herefordshire	51.97°N 02.84°W	SO4231
Wormegay	Norfolk	52.67°N 00.45°E	TF6611
Wormelow Tump	Herefordshire	51.96°N 02.74°W	SO4930
Wormhill	Derbyshire	53.26°N 01.82°W	SK1274
Wormingford	Essex	51.94°N 00.80°E	TL9331
Worminghall	Buckinghamshire	51.76°N 01.07°W	SP6408
Wormington	Gloucestershire	52.02°N 01.95°W	SP0336
Worminster	Somerset	51.17°N 02.61°W	ST5742
Wormit	Fife	56.42°N 02.99°W	NO3926
Wormleighton	Warwickshire	52.17°N 01.35°W	SP4453
Wormley	Hertfordshire	51.72°N 00.03°W	TL3605
Wormley	Surrey	51.13°N 00.65°W	SU9438
Wormleybury	Hertfordshire	51.72°N 00.03°W	TL3605
Wormley West End	Hertfordshire	51.72°N 00.07°W	TL3305
Worms Ash	Worcestershire	52.34°N 02.08°W	SO9472
Worms Head	Swansea	51.56°N 04.29°W	SS410873
Worms Hill	Kent	51.12°N 00.47°E	TQ7339
Wormshill	Kent	51.28°N 00.68°E	TQ8757
Wormsley	Herefordshire	52.11°N 02.84°W	SO4247
Wornish Nook	Cheshire	53.18°N 02.24°W	SJ8465
Worplesdon	Surrey	51.26°N 00.61°W	SU9753
Worrall	Sheffield	53.42°N 01.54°W	SK3092
Worrall Hill	Gloucestershire	51.82°N 02.58°W	SO6014
Worsbrough	Barnsley	53.52°N 01.47°W	SE3503
Worsbrough Bridge	Barnsley	53.52°N 01.47°W	SE3503
Worsbrough Common	Barnsley	53.53°N 01.48°W	SE3404
Worsbrough Dale	Barnsley	53.52°N 01.45°W	SE3603
Worsham	Oxfordshire	51.78°N 01.58°W	SP2910
Worsley	Salford	53.50°N 02.39°W	SD7401
Worsley Hall	Wigan	53.54°N 02.68°W	SD5505
Worsley Mesnes	Wigan	53.53°N 02.65°W	SD5704
Worstead	Norfolk	52.78°N 01.40°E	TG3026
Worsthorne	Lancashire	53.78°N 02.19°W	SD8732
Worston	Devon	50.36°N 03.98°W	SX5953
Worston	Lancashire	53.87°N 02.36°W	SD7642
Worten	Kent	51.15°N 00.81°E	TQ9743
Worth	Kent	51.24°N 01.33°E	TR3355
Worth	Somerset	51.20°N 02.70°W	ST5145
Worth	West Sussex	51.10°N 00.14°W	TQ3036
Worth Abbey	West Sussex	51.09°N 00.13°W	TQ3134
Wortham	Suffolk	52.35°N 01.05°E	TM0877
Worthen	Shropshire	52.62°N 03.00°W	SJ3204
Worthenbury	Wrexham	53.00°N 02.86°W	SJ4246
Worthing	Norfolk	52.73°N 00.94°E	TF9919
Worthing	West Sussex	50.81°N 00.39°W	TQ1303
Worthington	Leicestershire	52.77°N 01.40°W	SK4020
Worth Matravers	Dorset	50.59°N 02.04°W	SY9777
Worthy	Somerset	51.21°N 03.64°W	SS8548
Worthybrook	Monmouthshire	51.79°N 02.76°W	SO4711
Worting	Hampshire	51.26°N 01.14°W	SU6052
Wortley	Barnsley	53.48°N 01.54°W	SK3099
Wortley	Gloucestershire	51.61°N 02.34°W	ST7691
Wortley	Leeds	53.78°N 01.60°W	SE2632
Worton	North Yorkshire	54.30°N 02.07°W	SD9590
Worton	Oxfordshire	51.79°N 01.33°W	SP4611
Worton	Wiltshire	51.31°N 02.04°W	ST9757
Wortwell	Norfolk	52.40°N 01.33°E	TM2784
Wotherton	Shropshire	52.59°N 03.06°W	SJ2800
Wothorpe	Peterborough	52.63°N 00.49°W	TF0205
Wotter	Devon	50.43°N 04.04°W	SX5561
Wotton	Devon	50.50°N 03.69°W	SX8069
Wotton	Gloucestershire	51.86°N 02.23°W	SO8418
Wotton	Surrey	51.21°N 00.39°W	TQ1247
Wotton-under-Edge	Gloucestershire	51.62°N 02.34°W	ST7692
Wotton Underwood	Buckinghamshire	51.82°N 01.01°W	SP6815
Woughton on the Green	Milton Keynes	52.02°N 00.73°W	SP8737
Wouldham	Kent	51.34°N 00.45°E	TQ7164
Woundale	Shropshire	52.52°N 02.34°W	SO7792

== Wr ==
Location	Locality	Coordinates (links to map & photo sources)	OS grid reference
Wrabness	Essex	51.93°N 01.15°E	TM1731
Wrafton	Devon	51.09°N 04.15°W	SS4935
Wragby	Lincolnshire	53.28°N 00.30°W	TF1378
Wragby	Wakefield	53.64°N 01.38°W	SE4117
Wragholme	Lincolnshire	53.45°N 00.06°E	TF3797
Wramplingham	Norfolk	52.61°N 01.11°E	TG1106
Wrangaton	Devon	50.39°N 03.87°W	SX6757
Wrangbrook	Wakefield	53.61°N 01.26°W	SE4913
Wrangle	Lincolnshire	53.03°N 00.11°E	TF4251
Wrangle Bank	Lincolnshire	53.05°N 00.11°E	TF4253
Wrangle Lowgate	Lincolnshire	53.03°N 00.13°E	TF4351
Wrangle Low Ground	Lincolnshire	53.04°N 00.11°E	TF4252
Wrangway	Somerset	50.94°N 03.25°W	ST1217
Wrantage	Somerset	50.99°N 02.99°W	ST3022
Wrawby	North Lincolnshire	53.55°N 00.46°W	TA0208
Wraxall	Dorset	50.80°N 02.62°W	ST5601
Wraxall (near Nailsea)	North Somerset	51.43°N 02.73°W	ST4971
Wraxall (Ditcheat, near Castle Cary)	Somerset	51.12°N 02.57°W	ST6036
Wray	Lancashire	54.09°N 02.61°W	SD6067
Wray Common	Surrey	51.23°N 00.19°W	TQ2650
Wraysbury	Berkshire	51.45°N 00.56°W	TQ0074
Wrayton	Lancashire	54.14°N 02.59°W	SD6172
Wrea Green	Lancashire	53.77°N 02.92°W	SD3931
Wreaks End	Cumbria	54.26°N 03.19°W	SD2286
Wreath	Somerset	50.86°N 02.93°W	ST3408
Wreaths	Angus	56.58°N 02.99°W	NO3944
Wreay (Carlisle)	Cumbria	54.82°N 02.88°W	NY4348
Wreay (Eden)	Cumbria	54.59°N 02.86°W	NY4423
Wrecclesham	Surrey	51.18°N 00.82°W	SU8244
Wrekenton	Gateshead	54.92°N 01.58°W	NZ2759
Wrelton	North Yorkshire	54.26°N 00.83°W	SE7686
Wrenbury-cum-Frith	Cheshire	53.01°N 02.61°W	SJ5947
Wreningham	Norfolk	52.53°N 01.16°E	TM1598
Wrentham	Suffolk	52.37°N 01.65°E	TM4982
Wrenthorpe	Wakefield	53.69°N 01.53°W	SE3122
Wrentnall	Shropshire	52.62°N 02.85°W	SJ4203
Wressle	East Riding of Yorkshire	53.77°N 00.92°W	SE7131
Wressle	North Lincolnshire	53.56°N 00.53°W	SE9709
Wrestlingworth	Bedfordshire	52.10°N 00.17°W	TL2547
Wretton	Norfolk	52.56°N 00.47°E	TL6899
Wrexham	(Wrecsam) Wrexham	53.04°N 03.00°W	SJ3350
Wreyland	Devon	50.61°N 03.72°W	SX7881
Wribbenhall	Worcestershire	52.37°N 02.30°W	SO7975
Wrickton	Shropshire	52.46°N 02.53°W	SO6485
Wrightington Bar	Lancashire	53.61°N 02.71°W	SD5313
Wright's Green	Essex	51.83°N 00.17°E	TL5017
Wrights Green	Cheshire	53.35°N 02.55°W	SJ6384
Wrinehill	Staffordshire	53.02°N 02.37°W	SJ7547
Wringsdown	Cornwall	50.65°N 04.39°W	SX3187
Wrington	North Somerset	51.35°N 02.76°W	ST4762
Wrinkleberry	Devon	50.99°N 04.40°W	SS3124
Writhlington	Bath and North East Somerset	51.28°N 02.43°W	ST7054
Writtle	Essex	51.72°N 00.41°E	TL6706
Wrockwardine	Shropshire	52.69°N 02.56°W	SJ6211
Wrockwardine Wood	Telford and Wrekin	52.69°N 02.44°W	SJ7011
Wroot	North Lincolnshire	53.51°N 00.93°W	SE7103
Wrose	Bradford	53.82°N 01.75°W	SE1637
Wrotham	Kent	51.30°N 00.29°E	TQ6059
Wrotham Heath	Kent	51.29°N 00.33°E	TQ6358
Wroughton	Swindon	51.51°N 01.79°W	SU1480
Wroxall	Isle of Wight	50.60°N 01.22°W	SZ5579
Wroxall	Warwickshire	52.33°N 01.67°W	SP2271
Wroxeter	Shropshire	52.66°N 02.65°W	SJ5608
Wroxham	Norfolk	52.70°N 01.40°E	TG3017
Wroxton	Oxfordshire	52.06°N 01.40°W	SP4141

== Wy ==
Location	Locality	Coordinates (links to map & photo sources)	OS grid reference
Wyaston	Derbyshire	52.97°N 01.73°W	SK1842
Wyatts Green	Essex	51.66°N 00.29°E	TQ5999
Wybers Wood	North East Lincolnshire	53.55°N 00.14°W	TA2308
Wyberton	Lincolnshire	52.95°N 00.05°W	TF3141
Wyboston	Bedfordshire	52.19°N 00.30°W	TL1656
Wybunbury	Cheshire	53.03°N 02.46°W	SJ6949
Wychbold	Worcestershire	52.28°N 02.11°W	SO9265
Wych Cross	East Sussex	51.06°N 00.01°E	TQ4131
Wychnor	Staffordshire	52.74°N 01.74°W	SK1716
Wychnor Bridges	Staffordshire	52.74°N 01.73°W	SK1816
Wyck	Hampshire	51.14°N 00.92°W	SU7539
Wyck Rissington	Gloucestershire	51.88°N 01.72°W	SP1921
Wycliffe	Durham	54.52°N 01.83°W	NZ1114
Wycoller	Lancashire	53.84°N 02.10°W	SD9339
Wycomb	Leicestershire	52.80°N 00.85°W	SK7724
Wycombe	Buckinghamshire	51.61°N 00.73°W	SU8891
Wyddial	Hertfordshire	51.96°N 00.01°W	TL3731
Wydra	North Yorkshire	53.98°N 01.69°W	SE2054
Wye	Kent	51.17°N 00.93°E	TR0546
Wyebanks	Kent	51.25°N 00.76°E	TQ9354
Wyegate Green	Gloucestershire	51.75°N 02.65°W	SO5506
Wyesham	Monmouthshire	51.80°N 02.71°W	SO5112
Wyfordby	Leicestershire	52.75°N 00.83°W	SK7918
Wyke	Bradford	53.73°N 01.77°W	SE1526
Wyke	Dorset	51.03°N 02.30°W	ST7926
Wyke	Shropshire	52.61°N 02.53°W	SJ6402
Wyke	Surrey	51.25°N 00.68°W	SU9251
Wyke Champflower	Somerset	51.10°N 02.48°W	ST6634
Wyke Green	Devon	50.75°N 02.99°W	SY3096
Wykeham	Lincolnshire	52.81°N 00.11°W	TF2726
Wykeham (Ryedale)	North Yorkshire	54.17°N 00.75°W	SE815752
Wykeham (Scarborough)	North Yorkshire	54.23°N 00.52°W	SE9683
Wyken	Coventry	52.41°N 01.47°W	SP3680
Wyken	Shropshire	52.54°N 02.35°W	SO7694
Wyke Regis	Dorset	50.59°N 02.48°W	SY6677
Wykey	Shropshire	52.81°N 02.90°W	SJ3924
Wykin	Leicestershire	52.55°N 01.41°W	SP4095
Wylam	Northumberland	54.97°N 01.82°W	NZ1164
Wylde	Herefordshire	52.30°N 02.80°W	SO4568
Wylde Green	Birmingham	52.54°N 01.82°W	SP1294
Wyllie	Caerphilly	51.63°N 03.20°W	ST1794
Wylye	Wiltshire	51.13°N 02.00°W	SU008377
Wymans Brook	Gloucestershire	51.91°N 02.08°W	SO9424
Wymbush	Milton Keynes	52.03°N 00.80°W	SP8238
Wymering	City of Portsmouth	50.85°N 01.07°W	SU6506
Wymeswold	Leicestershire	52.80°N 01.11°W	SK6023
Wymington	Bedfordshire	52.26°N 00.60°W	SP9564
Wymondham	Leicestershire	52.75°N 00.74°W	SK8518
Wymondham	Norfolk	52.56°N 01.11°E	TG1101
Wymondley Bury	Hertfordshire	51.92°N 00.24°W	TL2127
Wymott	Lancashire	53.67°N 02.75°W	SD5020
Wyndham	Bridgend	51.60°N 03.54°W	SS9391
Wyndham Park	The Vale Of Glamorgan	51.47°N 03.32°W	ST0876
Wynds Point	Herefordshire	52.05°N 02.35°W	SO7640
Wynford Eagle	Dorset	50.75°N 02.59°W	SY5895
Wyng	Orkney Islands	58.79°N 03.19°W	ND3190
Wynn's Green	Herefordshire	52.12°N 02.58°W	SO6047
Wyre	Orkney Islands	59.12°N 02.97°W	HY443263
Wyre Piddle	Worcestershire	52.12°N 02.05°W	SO9647
Wysall	Nottinghamshire	52.83°N 01.11°W	SK6027
Wyson	Herefordshire	52.29°N 02.72°W	SO5167
Wythall	Worcestershire	52.37°N 01.89°W	SP0775
Wytham	Oxfordshire	51.76°N 01.32°W	SP4708
Wythenshawe	Manchester	53.38°N 02.27°W	SJ8288
Wythop Mill	Cumbria	54.64°N 03.28°W	NY1729
Wyton	Cambridgeshire	52.33°N 00.12°W	TL2772
Wyton	East Riding of Yorkshire	53.78°N 00.22°W	TA1733
Wyverstone	Suffolk	52.26°N 00.98°E	TM0467
Wyverstone Green	Suffolk	52.26°N 00.98°E	TM0467
Wyverstone Street	Suffolk	52.26°N 00.97°E	TM0367
Wyville	Lincolnshire	52.85°N 00.69°W	SK8829
