= Wotton =

Wotton may refer to:

== Places ==
- Wotton, Barbados
- Wotton, Gloucester, Gloucestershire, England
- Wotton, Quebec, Canada
- Wotton, Surrey, England
  - Wotton House, Surrey, Grade II listed building
- Wotton-under-Edge, town in Gloucestershire, England
- Wotton Underwood, village in Buckinghamshire, England
  - Wotton House, Grade I listed country house

== People ==
- Anthony Wotton (c.1561–1626), English clergyman and controversialist
- David Wotton (born 1942), Australian politician
- Sir Edward Wotton (1489–1551), English public official, treasurer of Calais
- Edward Wotton (zoologist) (1492–1552), English zoologist
- Edward Wotton, 1st Baron Wotton (1548–1628), English diplomat
- Sir Henry Wotton (1568–1639), English author and diplomat
- Henry Wotton (poet) (16th century), English poet and translator
- John Wotton (16th century), English politician
- Lex Wotton (born c.1968), Aboriginal Australian elder and political activist
- Lou Wotton (born 1983), Australian rules footballer
- Mabel Wotton (1863–1927), English writer
- Margaret Wotton, Marchioness of Dorset (1485–1539)
- Mark Wotton (born 1973), Canadian ice hockey player
- Nicholas Wotton (mayor) (or Wootton; d.1448), English merchant and official, Lord Mayor of London
- Nicholas Wotton (c.1497–1567), English diplomat
- Paul Wotton (born 1977), English football player and manager
- Rob Wotton, British sports news presenter/reporter
- Roger Wotton (1919–2012), Australian politician
- Thomas Wotton (disambiguation), several people
- William Wotton (1666–1727), English theologian, classical scholar and linguist

== Other ==
- Lord Henry Wotton, fictional character in Oscar Wilde's The Picture of Dorian Gray
- Wotton Hundred, ancient subdivision of the county of Surrey, England
- Wotton Tramway, rail line in Buckinghamshire, England

== See also ==
- Wooten (surname)
- Wootten (surname)
- Wooton (disambiguation)
- Wootton (disambiguation)
