= Wooton =

Wooton may refer to:

== Places ==
- Wooton, Claverley, a location in Shropshire, England
- Wooton, Whitton, a location in Shropshire, England
- Wooton, Kentucky, an unincorporated community

== People ==
- Elmer Otis Wooton (1865–1945), American botanist
- Ernest Wooton (1941–2020), American politician
- John Wooton, American percussionist
- Richens Lacey Wootton (c.1816–1893), American frontiersman
- William R. Wooton (born 1944), American politician and judge

== See also ==
- Wooton desk, 19th-century American furniture style
- Wootton (disambiguation)
- Wooten
- Wotton (disambiguation)
