= Wootton =

Wootton is an English place name meaning place by the wood. The standard pronunciation rhymes the first syllable with foot.

== Places ==
Places in England called Wootton

- Wootton, Bedfordshire
- Wootton Fitzpaine, Dorset
- Wootton, New Forest, hamlet in south-west Hampshire
- Wootton St Lawrence, village near Basingstoke, Hampshire
- Wootton, Almeley, a location in Herefordshire
- Wootton, Dormington, a location in Herefordshire
- Wootton, Isle of Wight
  - Wootton Bridge
- Wootton, Kent
- Wootton, Lincolnshire
- Wootton, Northamptonshire
- Wootton, Vale of White Horse, Oxfordshire
- Wootton, West Oxfordshire, Oxfordshire (also known as Wootton-by-Woodstock)
- Wootton, Onibury, a location in Shropshire
- Wootton, Oswestry Rural, a location in Shropshire
- Wootton, Staffordshire, East Staffordshire
- Wootton, Stafford, a location in Staffordshire
- Wootton Wawen, village in Stratford, England
- Royal Wootton Bassett, town in Wiltshire
- Wootton Rivers, Wiltshire
- Leek Wootton, Warwickshire
- Woottons, a location in Staffordshire

Places in Australia called Wootton

- Wootton, New South Wales

Fictional places called Wootton

- Wootton Major, a fictional place in the short story Smith of Wootton Major by J. R. R. Tolkien

== People ==
Wootton is also a surname derived from the place name.

- Barbara Adam Wootton, economist
- Beau Wootton, Australian para-cyclist
- Bob Wootton, folk guitarist with Johnny Cash
- Brenda Wootton, Cornish folk singer
- Chris Wootton, Australian Race Driver
- Corey Wootton, American football player
- David Wootton (historian), British historian
- David Wootton (lord mayor), British lawyer and politician
- Curt Wootton, American actor
- Frank Wootton, English painter
- Frank Wootton, Australian jockey
- George Wootton (1834-1924), English cricketer
- Jeff Wootton, English musician
- John Wootton, English painter
- Lloyd "Moon" Wootton, Canadian lacrosse player
- Marc Wootton (born 1975), English comedian
- Richens Lacey Wootton
- Scott Wootton, English footballer
- Thomas Sprigg Wootton, founder of Montgomery County, Maryland
- Tom Wootton, English politician

== See also ==
- Wootten
- Wooten
- North Wootton (disambiguation)
- Wotton (disambiguation)
- Thomas S. Wootton High School
