= Dutchland Farms =

New England-area restaurant and dairy company

Dutchland Farms, Inc.
- Company type: Privately held company
- Industry: Restaurants, Dairy products
- Founded: 1897 (dairy farm), 1929 (restaurants)
- Founder: Fred F. Field
- Defunct: 1940
- Fate: Merged with Howard Johnson's
- Successor: Howard Johnson's
- Headquarters: Brockton, MA, United States
- Number of locations: 50 (1935)
- Areas served: Massachusetts, Connecticut, Rhode Island, New Hampshire, and New Jersey
- Products: Dairy products

Dutchland Farms was an American regional distributor of dairy products based in Brockton, Massachusetts. It started as a farm in 1897 which later expanded into restaurant franchising during the 1930s. Its restaurants were known for their distinctive orange and blue buildings with a trademark windmill atop the entrance.

The company promoted the use of Grade "A" dairy milk in its ice cream, while comparable producers at the time still used Grade "B" milk. It competed in the New England market alongside Howard Johnson's into the 1930s; some Dutchland stores were converted to Howard Johnson's units before being acquired as a whole company in 1940.

== History ==
A lover of animals and a student, particularly of breeding of domestic stock, from boyhood, Fred F. Field established Dutchland Farms as a hobby in 1897, setting up a model dairy, supplying many of the residents of Brockton and vicinity with milk and cream.

Dutchland Farms had become recognized internationally for its herd of purebred Holstein Friesian cattle, some individual members of which made and held world records for milk and butter production. Progeny from this famous herd enriched the livestock of regal bovine blood in North and South America, Africa, and other distant countries. Authorities on the breeding of dairy cattle crossed the seven seas to personally select Dutchland Farms bull calves and heifers to improve the standards of their own herds.

In 1929, a disastrous fire occurred at Dutchland Farms, destroying several valuable buildings which brought about the dispersal of the herd. Turning from the satisfaction of having bred the best Holstein herd in the world, farm owner Fred Fields set his sights on restaurant operations. Fields had successfully operated several roadside stands, and had a vision of a "Glorified Road-side Stand," dispensing quality ice cream unfamiliar to the motoring public. By the 1930s, Dutchland Farms ice cream became available on principal highways in Massachusetts.

Following Field's death, the Dutchland Farms operation continued to be owned and operated by his immediate family to the third generation, with franchised restaurants now spanning from New Hampshire to New Jersey.

== Acquisition ==
By 1940, the Howard Johnson Company, founded by Howard Deering Johnson, had surpassed Dutchland Farms in its presence across New England motorways, and was more familiar to the traveling public. Dutchland's Middleboro, MA and Milford, CT locations had already joined Howard Johnson's restaurant chain by this time, and it is believed that within the same year the Howard Johnson Company had acquired the remainder of the Dutchland Farms corporation. Howard Johnson's continued to use elements from the chain, including the trademarked orange and blue colors.
