= Woolston =

Woolston may refer to:

== Places ==
=== United Kingdom ===
- Woolston, Cheshire, a village and civil parish in Warrington
- Woolston, Devon, on the list of United Kingdom locations: Woof-Wy near Kingsbridge, Devon
- Woolston, Southampton, a city suburb in Hampshire
- Some hamlets:
  - Woolston, Cornwall, to the northwest of St Ive
  - Woolston, north Shropshire, near Oswestry
  - Woolston, south Shropshire, near Church Stretton and Craven Arms
  - Woolston, Bicknoller, Somerset
  - Woolston, North Cadbury, Somerset

=== New Zealand ===
- Woolston, New Zealand, a suburb of Christchurch

== People ==
- Andrew Woolston, English curler in the 2010–2015 European Curling Championships
- Beulah Woolston (1828–1886), pioneering American missionary teacher in China
- Bob Woolston (born 1968), English cricketer
- Thomas Woolston (1668–1733), English theologian
- Thomas G. Woolston (fl. 1995), American patent attorney
- Florence Guy Woolston Seabury (1881–1951), suffragist, journalist in New York

== Sports clubs ==
- Woolston Rovers, a rugby league team based in Warrington
- Woolston Technical, a semi-professional association football club based in Woolston, New Zealand
- Woolston W.M.C., an association football club based in Woolston, New Zealand
- Woolston Works F.C., a defunct late 19th century football club formerly based at Woolston, Hampshire

== Other uses ==
- HMS Woolston (1918) (L49), a W Class destroyer of the Royal Navy
- Woolston Memorial Hospital, a Christian hospital established in 19th century Fuzhou
- Woolston railway station, serving Woolston, Southampton
- Woolston School, a secondary comprehensive school in Southampton, Hampshire, in southern England
- Woolston-Steen Theological Seminary, a college in Index, Washington, U.S., offering degrees in Wiccan Ministry.

== See also ==
- Woolaston, a village in the Forest of Dean, Gloucestershire, England
- Woollaston (disambiguation), a disambiguation page
- Wolston, Warwickshire
