= Woollaston (disambiguation) =

Woollaston is a village in Staffordshire, England.

Woollaston may also refer to:

- Ben Woollaston (born 1987), English professional snooker player
- Philip Woollaston (born 1944), New Zealand politician
- Tatiana Woollaston (born 1986), professional snooker referee
- Toss Woollaston (1910–1998), New Zealand
- Woollaston baronets, a title in the Baronetage of Great Britain

== See also ==
- Woolaston, a village in the Forest of Dean, Gloucestershire, England
- Wollaston (disambiguation)
- Woolston (disambiguation)
