= Wollaston =

Wollaston may refer to:

== Places ==
=== Antarctica ===
- Cape Wollaston, Palmer Archipelago

=== Australia ===
- John Wollaston Anglican Community School, private school in Kelmscott, Perth, Western Australia
- Wollaston, Western Australia, suburb of Bunbury, Western Australia
- Wollaston Island (Western Australia), off the coast of Kimberley

=== Canada ===
- Wollaston, Ontario, a township
- Wollaston Islands (Nunavut)
- Wollaston Peninsula, split between Northwest Territories and Nunavut, Canada
- Wollaston Lake, lake in north-eastern Saskatchewan
  - Wollaston Lake Airport
- Wollaston Lake, Saskatchewan, a village

=== Chile ===
- Wollaston Islands, group of islands near Cape Horn

=== England ===
- Wollaston, Northamptonshire
  - Wollaston School
- Wollaston, Shropshire
- Wollaston, West Midlands

=== Greenland ===
- Wollaston Foreland, peninsula in Northeast Greenland

=== United States ===
- Wollaston (Quincy, Massachusetts), neighborhood in Quincy, Massachusetts
  - Wollaston (MBTA station), MBTA station
  - Wollaston Beach, public beach
  - Wollaston Theatre, historic building
- Mount Wollaston, various locations in Quincy, Massachusetts

=== Moon ===
- Wollaston (crater), lunar crater

== People ==
- Wollaston (surname)

== Other ==
- Wollaston Medal, awarded for work in geology
- Wollaston prism, optical device, invented by William Hyde Wollaston
- Wollaston's roundleaf bat, species of bat in the family Hipposideridae

== See also ==
- Woolaston, a village in Gloucestershire
- Woollaston (disambiguation)
- Wollaston family tree
