= WYNG =

WYNG or Wyng may refer to:

- Wyng, a location in Scotland
- WYNG (FM), a radio station (94.9 FM) licensed to serve Mt. Carmel, Illinois, United States
- Wing, Buckinghamshire
