= Listed buildings in Wrelton =

Wrelton is a civil parish in the county of North Yorkshire, England. It contains 19 listed buildings that are recorded in the National Heritage List for England. All the listed buildings are designated at Grade II, the lowest of the three grades, which is applied to "buildings of national importance and special interest". The parish contains the village of Wrelton and the surrounding area. All the listed buildings are in the village, and consist of houses and cottages, farmhouses and farm buildings, former workshops, a chapel with associated structures, and a hydrant.

== Buildings ==
Name and location	Photograph	Date	Notes
The Cruck Cottage; 54.26370°N 0.82717°W	—	1665	The house has a cruck framed core, and is encased in sandstone. It has a pantile roof with coped gables and shaped kneelers at two levels. There are two storeys and four bays, and an outshut. The doorway and windows date from the 20th century. Inside, there are two pairs of full crucks.
Foundry Cottages; 54.26440°N 0.82235°W		Early 18th century or earlier	A pair of cottages in limestone with quoins and a pantile roof. There are two low storeys and four bays. On the front is a blocked doorway, and the entrances are at the rear. There is one fixed-light window, and the others are horizontally sliding sashes.
Beech Farmhouse; 54.26456°N 0.82525°W		18th century	The farmhouse is in limestone on a plinth, with quoins, and a pantile roof with a coped gable and a shaped kneeler on the left. There are two storeys and attics, and three bays. On the front are two doorways with fanlights, the windows on the attic are horizontally-sliding sashes, and the others are later replacements.
Highway Cottage; 54.26557°N 0.82434°W	—	18th century	The house is in limestone with a pantile roof. There are two storeys and four bays. On the front is a doorway, and the windows are horizontally sliding sashes. All the openings have painted timber lintels.
Ryedale and Ivy Dene; 54.26455°N 0.82168°W	—	18th century	Three, later two, cottages in limestone with a pantile roof. There are two storeys, and each cottage has three bays, the right bay of the right cottage raised. Both cottages have a doorway, and the windows are sashes, some horizontally sliding.
Wrelton Hall; 54.26485°N 0.82301°W	—	18th century	The house, which has been extended, is in limestone, with the later extensions in brick, quoins, and a slate roof on the main house with coped gables and shaped kneelers, and pantile roofs elsewhere. The main range has a moulded cornice, two storeys and four bays, a single-storey outbuilding recessed on the left, and rear extensions. On the front is a Doric porch, a doorway with pilaster jambs and a patterned fanlight, a sash window to the left with a keystone, a French window, and a bullseye window flanked by canted bay windows. The upper floor windows are casements with tripartite lintels and keystones, and above are flat-roofed dormers.
Dovecote northwest of Wrelton Hall; 54.26501°N 0.82335°W	—	Mid-18th century	The dovecote, later used for other purposes, is in limestone with quoins and a hipped pantile roof. There is a square plan, one storey and a loft, and one bay. It contains double doors, above which is a louvred opening, and on the roof is a glover.
Outbuildings east of Wrelton Hall; 54.26464°N 0.82269°W	—	Mid-18th century	The outbuildings consist of a barn, a stable and a carriage shed. They are in limestone on a plinth, with sandstone quoins and a pantile roof with coped gables and shaped kneelers. The barn has two storeys and two bays, and the stable and carriage shed have one storey and a loft, and three bays. The openings include doorways, windows, pitching doors and slit vents.
Broomfield House; 54.26444°N 0.82396°W		Late 18th century	The house is in limestone, with quoins, a moulded eaves cornice, and a pantile roof with coped gables and shaped kneelers. There are two storeys, three bays, a single-bay extension on the left and a rear wing. The doorway has a fanlight, the windows are casements, one blocked, and all the openings on the front have raised surrounds and triple keystones. On the rear wing is a horizontally-sliding sash window and a round-headed window above. Also at the rear is a former carriage house with a segmental arch of voussoirs.
Manor Garth; 54.26418°N 0.82517°W	—	Late 18th century	The house is in limestone on a sandstone plinth, with chamfered quoins, a floor band, a moulded cornice, and a pantile roof with coped gables and shaped kneelers. There are two storeys and three bays, and the gable end faces the street. In the centre is a doorway, and there is another doorway on the left return with a divided fanlight and a wedge lintel. The windows are sashes with keystones.
Pear Tree Villa; 54.26579°N 0.82427°W	—	Late 18th century	The house is in limestone, with a coved eaves course, and a pantile roof with coped gables and shaped kneelers. There are two storeys and three bays, and the gable end faces the street. The doorway is in the centre, and most of the windows are horizontally sliding sashes.
Croft Head Farmhouse and railings 54.26438°N 0.82356°W		Early 19th century	The house, with its rear facing the street, is in limestone, with sandstone dressings, quoins, an eaves course, and a pantile roof with coped gables and shaped kneelers. There are two storeys, three bays, and a single-storey rear outshut. In the centre is a doorway with a blind patterned fanlight, the windows on the front are sashes, and all the openings have tripartite lintels and triple keystones. At the rear is a doorway with a semicircular fanlight and Gothic glazing, and to its left is a round-headed window, both with archivolts and keystones. The small garden is partly enclosed by railings with urn finials on a chamfered plinth, and they span a massive stone water butt.
Farm buildings south of Croft Head Farmhouse; 54.26412°N 0.82361°W	—	Early 19th century	The farm buildings are in limestone with sandstone quoins, and a pantile roof, hipped at the left end, and include a pigsty, cart sheds, cow byres and stables, a granary and implement sheds. There is one storey and lofts, and twelve bays. The openings include segmental cart arches with voussoirs, stable doors, pitching windows and lifting doors. At the left end are three pig troughs with shaped lintels.
Foundry Farmhouse and outbuilding 54.26442°N 0.82181°W	—	Early 19th century	The house and outbuilding are in limestone, and have pantile roofs with coped gables and shaped kneelers. There are two storeys and two bays. The door has a rectangular fanlight, and the windows are small-paned casements. The outbuilding to the right has one storey and an attic and two bays. It contains a doorway and casement windows.
Groom's Cottage northeast of Wrelton Hall; 54.26517°N 0.82286°W	—	Early 19th century	The house is in limestone, and has a pantile roof with coped gables and shaped kneelers. There are two storeys and two bays, and an outshut. On the front are two doorways, and the windows are horizontally sliding sashes.
Former smithy, Foundry Farmhouse; 54.26446°N 0.82205°W	—	19th century or earlier	The smithy, later used for other purposes, is in limestone with a pantile roof. There is a single storey and two bays. On the front is a doorway, and to its right is a smithy window with nine narrow lights.
Joiners' Shop attached to Ivy Dene; 54.26452°N 0.82151°W	—	19th century or earlier	The joiner's shop, later used for other purposes, is in limestone with a corrugated zinc roof. There are two storeys and two bays. On the front are paired doors under a heavy timber lintel, and a blocked window to the right. There is another doorway on the right gable end.
Methodist Chapel, gates and railings 54.26437°N 0.82161°W		1840	The chapel is in limestone, and has a hipped slate roof with grooved stone scrolls at the corners. There is a single storey, three bays, and a lean-to extension on the right. In the centre is a projecting gabled porch with scalloped bargeboards, and a doorway with a semicircular fanlight. The windows are sashes, on the lean-to is a doorway, and all have round heads, archivolts, imposts and keystones. Above the porch is a stone with a circular inscribed and dated panel, and a clock. In front of the chapel are cast iron railings and gates with pointed finials.
Hydrant; 54.26584°N 0.82432°W	—	Late 19th century	The hydrant is in cast iron, and is about 1.1 metres (3 ft 7 in) in height. It consists of a fluted column on a circular base with a pierced bucket stand, and has a spherical cap and a finial.
