= Lye Green =

Hamlet in Buckinghamshire, England

Coordinates: 51.720°N 0.584°W

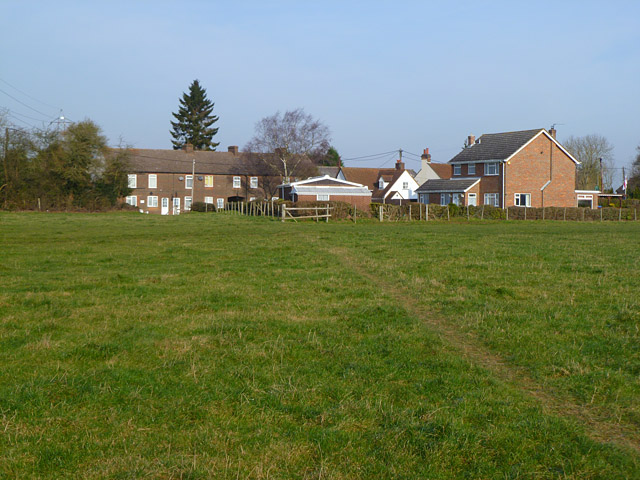
Pasture and houses, Lye Green

Lye Green is a hamlet in the civil parish of Chesham in Buckinghamshire, England. It is located north east of Chesham. Lycrome Road runs through the centre of the hamlet, from the A416 in the east to the B4505 in the west.

The hamlet consists of a green and a public house called The Black Cat. The church community of Lye Green had met in rooms at the pub which was run by Miss Bessie Bangay, an Anglican church leader from the 1930s to the 1960s. The Woottens Luxury Travel part of the Bowen Bus Group is located opposite the Black Cat.
