= Howard Johnson's =

American chain of hotels and motels

Howard Johnson International Inc.
- Formerly: Howard Johnson's
- Industry: Hotels, formerly restaurants
- Founded: February 1, 1925; 101 years ago in Quincy, Massachusetts (restaurants); 1954 in Savannah, Georgia (motor lodges)
- Founder: Howard Deering Johnson
- Defunct: March 2022; 4 years ago (restaurants only)
- Headquarters: Parsippany, New Jersey, U.S.
- Number of locations: Hotels: 304 (Dec. 31, 2025)
- Areas served: North America, South America, Asia, Middle East
- Key people: Anthony Pizzuto (President)
- Parent: Wyndham Hotels & Resorts
- Website: www.wyndhamhotels.com/hojo

Howard Johnson by Wyndham, still commonly referred to as Howard Johnson's, is an American hotel brand with roughly 300 hotels in 15 countries. It was also formerly a restaurant chain, which at one time was the largest in the U.S., with more than 1,000 locations. Since 2006, all hotels and company trademarks, including those of the defunct restaurant chain, have been owned by Wyndham Hotels and Resorts.

Howard Johnson's restaurants originally started as a single location opened by Howard Deering Johnson in 1925 and grew into a substantial restaurant chain in the decades that followed. By the 1950s, the company expanded operations by opening hotels, then known as Howard Johnson's Motor Lodges, which were often located next to restaurants. Throughout the 1960s and 1970s, it had become the largest restaurant chain in the U.S., with its combined company-owned and franchised outlets. Howard Johnson's served more meals outside the home during the 1960s than any other company or organization except for the United States Army.

Howard Johnson's restaurants were franchised separately from the hotel brand beginning in 1986 but, in the years that followed, severely dwindled in number until eventually disappearing altogether. The last restaurant, in Lake George, New York, closed in 2022. The line of branded supermarket frozen foods, as well as its famous ice cream, are no longer manufactured.

Paul Freedman wrote that "Howard Johnson's influence is most apparent in two innovations: its pioneering use of franchising and its adaptation to the American highway." He explained that fast food chains "trimmed and improved on Howard Johnson's highway restaurant model by specializing in one or two items and putting into effect a system that allowed patrons to get their food quickly and eat it in a minimally decorated restaurant environment, or even in their cars." Another major Howard Johnson's innovation was sending out frozen foods to branches from regional commissaries, a system which reduced cost, assured uniformity, and was later utilized further by fast food chains.

== History ==
=== Early years ===
In 1925, Howard Deering Johnson borrowed $2,000 to buy and operate a small corner pharmacy in Wollaston, a neighborhood in Quincy, Massachusetts. Johnson was surprised to find it easy to repay the loan after discovering his recently installed soda fountain had become the busiest part of his drugstore. He doubled the amount of butterfat content in his ice cream compared to what was on the market, and this recipe made it creamier. A 1940 Fortune article noted that Johnson's ice cream had a butterfat content of 18 or 19 percent while the law in most states required at least 10 percent. Some sources said the recipe was based on his mother's homemade ice creams and desserts, while other sources said that it was from German American immigrant William Hallbauer, who owned an ice cream shop in Nahant, Massachusetts. Johnson developed 28 flavors of ice cream using syrup flavoring. Quoting Johnson, "I thought I had every flavor in the world. That '28' [flavors] became my trademark."

Throughout the summers of the late 1920s, Johnson opened beachfront concession stands along the coast of Massachusetts. They sold soft drinks, hot dogs, and ice cream. The first stand, opened in 1926, had done more ice cream business by the end of the summer than the pharmacy had done in two years. With a loan from Granite Trust Bank, the first Howard Johnson's restaurant opened in June 1929 in Quincy. They served traditional New England foods, such as roast turkey, steaks and chops, chicken pot pies, baked macaroni and cheese, baked beans, and his 28 flavors of ice cream.

The first Howard Johnson's restaurant received a tremendous boost in 1929, owing to an unusual set of circumstances: Malcolm Nichols, the mayor of nearby Boston, banned the production of Eugene O'Neill's play, Strange Interlude in Boston. Rather than fight the mayor, the Theatre Guild moved the production to the Wollaston Theatre in Quincy. The five-hour play was presented in two parts with a dinner break. The first Howard Johnson's restaurant was near the theater, and hundreds of influential Bostonians flocked to the restaurant. Through word of mouth, more Americans became familiar with the Howard Johnson Company.

=== The 1930s and 1940s ===
Howard Johnson Logo 1930s-1985

The "Simple Simon and the Pieman" logo designed by John E. Alcott became the corporate symbol of the Howard Johnson Company beginning in the 1930s

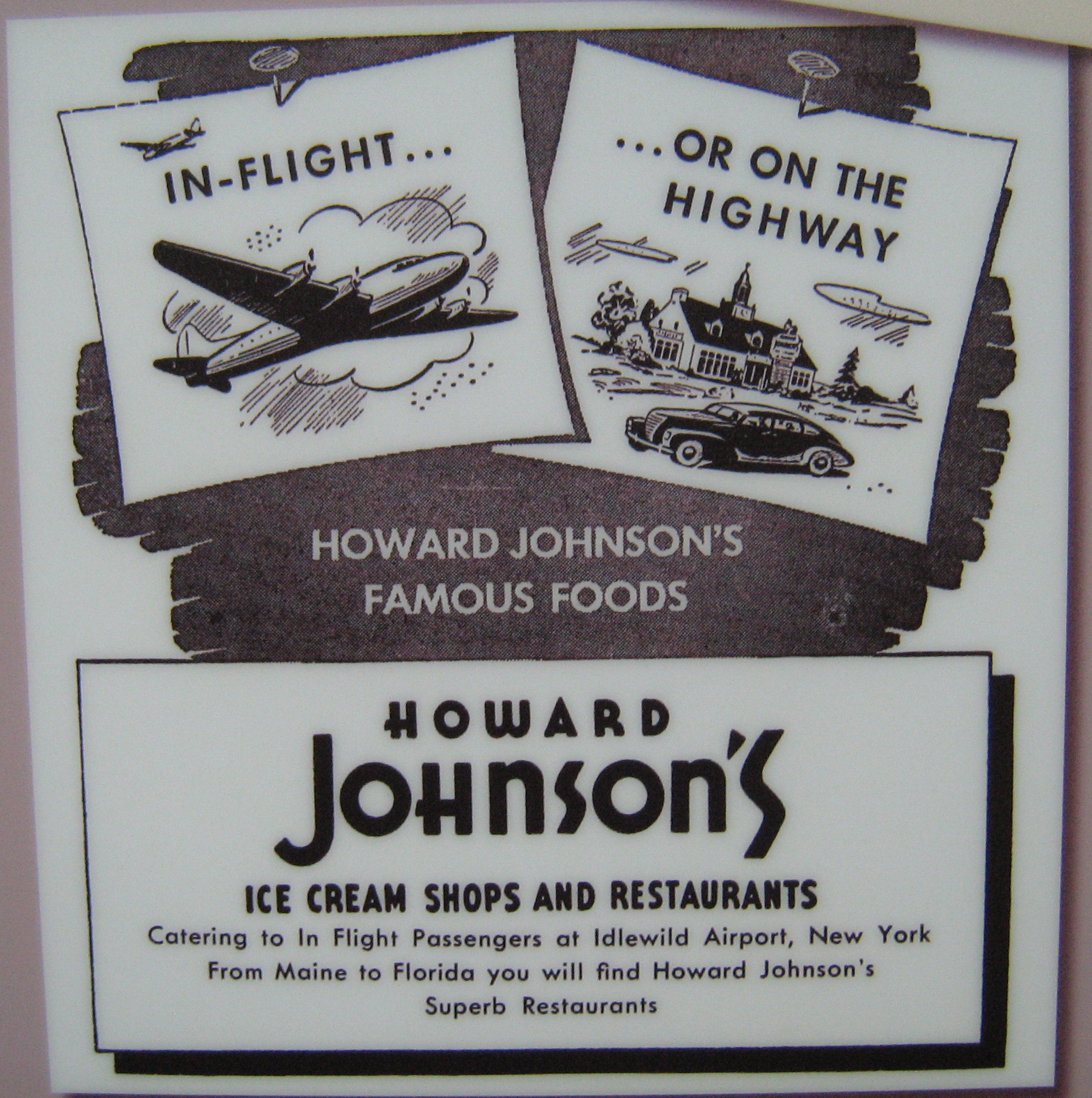
Howard Johnson entered the airline catering market

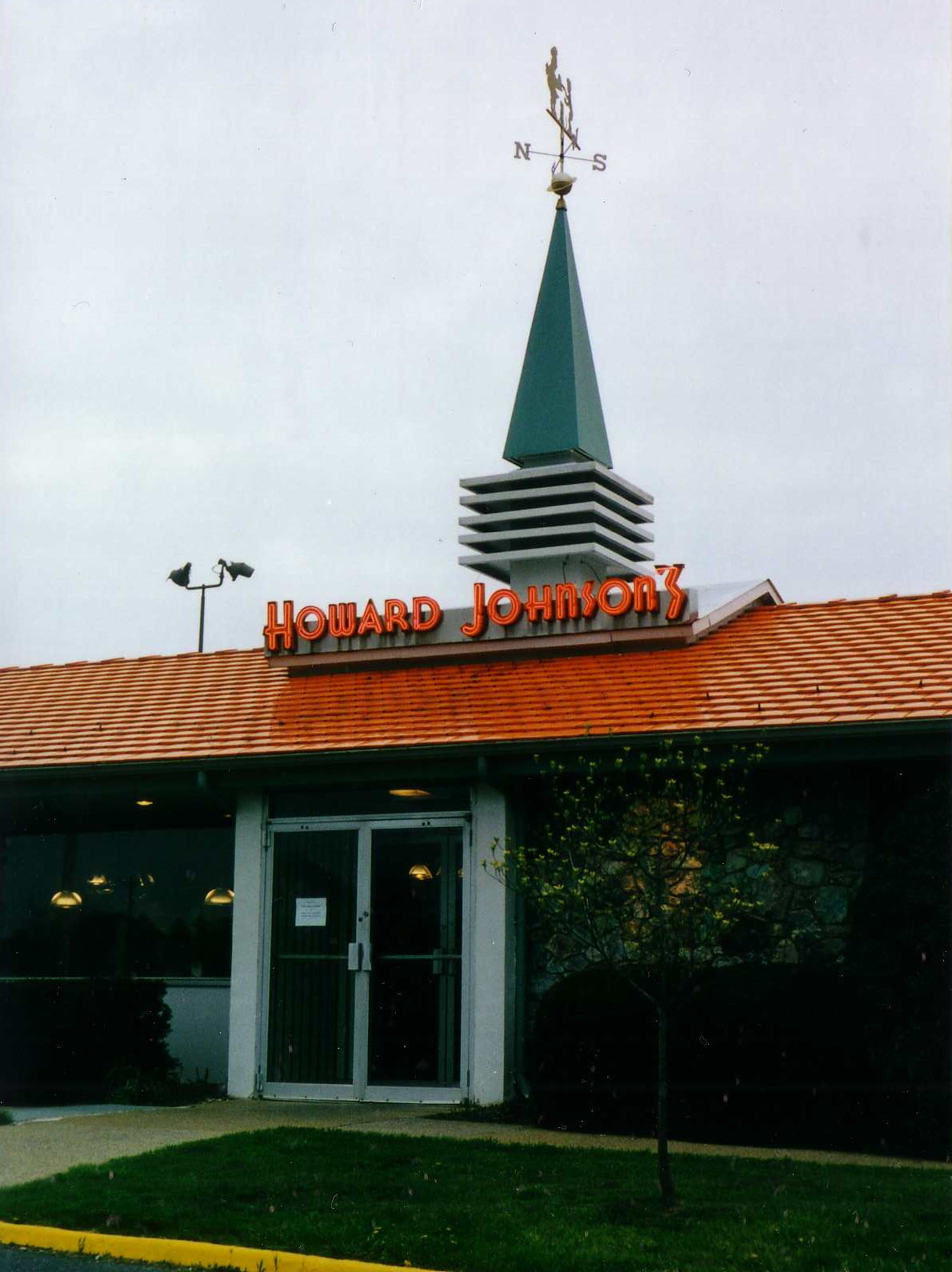
Howard Johnson's restaurant entrance with emblematic weather vane and orange roof

Johnson wanted to expand his company, but the stock market crash of 1929 prevented this. After waiting a few years and maintaining his business, Johnson persuaded an acquaintance in 1935 to open a second Howard Johnson's restaurant in Orleans, Massachusetts. The second restaurant was franchised and not company-owned. This was one of America's first franchising agreements.

By the end of 1936, there were 39 more franchised restaurants, creating a total of 41 Howard Johnson's restaurants. By 1939, there were 107 Howard Johnson's restaurants along American East Coast highways, generating revenues of $10.5 million. In less than 14 years, Johnson directed a franchise network of over 10,000 employees with 170 restaurants, many serving 1.5 million people a year. In the 1930s, Howard Deering Johnson bought the Red Coach Grill in Wayland, Massachusetts, and used it as the model for a more upscale steakhouse restaurant chain called Red Coach Grill.While they had some success, they were not sufficiently profitable.

Johnson’s success gave him the added opportunity to capitalize on getting his name around. When wealthy socialite Dorothy May Kinnicutt Parish (known as Sister Parish) began her decorating business in the 1930s, Johnson hired her to decorate the restaurant he built in Somerville, New Jersey. She told a reporter from The New York Times, “I dressed the waitresses in aqua, did the walls in aqua, I made the placemats in aqua. I guess I must have thought it was quite chic, but I haven’t done a thing in aqua since.” (quoted in A History of Howard Johnson’s by Anthony Mitchell Sammarco).

The unique icons of orange roofs, cupolas, and weather vanes on Howard Johnson properties helped patrons identify the chain's restaurants and motels. The restaurant's trademark Simple Simon and the Pieman logo was created by artist John Alcott in the 1930s while the fiberglass signs were sculptured by Charles Pizzano.

There were 200 Howard Johnson's restaurants when America entered World War II.

By 1944, only 12 Howard Johnson's restaurants remained in business. The effects of war rationing crippled the company. Johnson managed to maintain his business by serving commissary food to war workers and U.S. Army recruits. When the Pennsylvania Turnpike (1940), and later the Ohio Turnpike, New Jersey Turnpike and Connecticut Turnpike were built, Johnson bid for and won exclusive rights to serve drivers at service station turnoffs through the turnpike systems.

In the process of recovering from these losses, in 1947 the Howard Johnson Company began construction of 200 new restaurants throughout the American Southeast and Midwest. By 1951, the sales of the Howard Johnson Company totaled $115 million.

=== Entering the hotel business ===
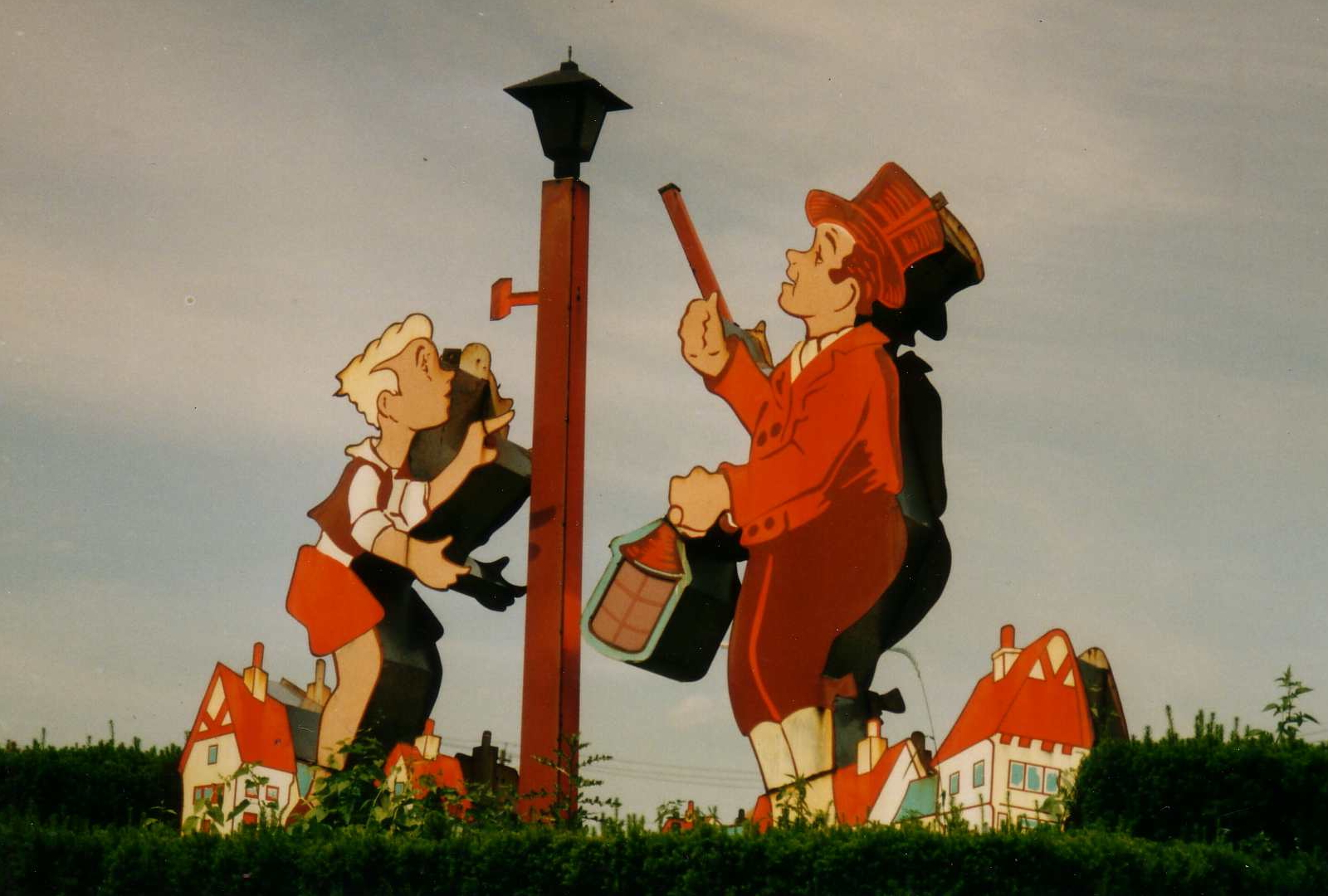
HoJo motor lodges used a lamplighter character lighting a lamppost with the Simple Simon character pointing to the light

By 1954, there were 400 Howard Johnson's restaurants in 32 states, about 10% of which were extremely profitable company-owned turnpike restaurants; the rest were franchises. This was one of the first nationwide restaurant chains.

While many places sold "fried clams", they were whole, which was not universally accepted by the American dining public. Howard Johnson popularized Soffron Brothers Clam Company's fried clam strips, the "foot" of hard-shelled sea clams. They became popular to eat in this fashion throughout the country.

In 1954, the company opened the first Howard Johnson's motor lodge in Savannah, Georgia. The company employed architects Rufus Nims and Karl Koch to oversee the design of the rooms and gate lodge. Nims had previously worked with the company, designing restaurants. The restaurant's trademark Simple Simon and the Pieman was now joined by a lamplighter character in the firm's marketing of its motels. According to cultural historians, the chain became synonymous with travel among American motorists and vacationers in part because of Johnson's ubiquitous outdoor advertising displays.

In 1959, Howard Deering Johnson, who had founded and managed the company since 1925, turned control over to his son, then 26-year-old Howard Brennan Johnson. The elder Johnson observed his son's running of the company until his death in 1972 at the age of 75.

Howard Johnson Company went public in 1961; there were 605 restaurants, 265 company-owned and 340 franchised, as well as 88 franchised Howard Johnson's motor lodges in 32 states and The Bahamas.

In 1961, Johnson hired New York chefs Pierre Franey and Jacques Pépin to oversee food development at the company's main commissary in Brockton, Massachusetts. Franey and Pépin developed recipes for the company's signature dishes that could be flash frozen and delivered across the country, guaranteeing a consistent product.

=== Civil rights ===
While the landmark Brown v. Board of Education decision by the United States Supreme Court in 1954 struck down segregation in public schools, the segregation, and maintenance of whites-only public facilities continued in other domains, including the Howard Johnson chain. Segregation in Howard Johnson's restaurants provoked an international crisis in 1957, when a Howard Johnson eatery in Dover, Delaware, refused service to Komla Agbeli Gbedemah, the finance minister of Ghana, prompting a public apology from President Dwight D. Eisenhower. The Congress of Racial Equality, or CORE, was instrumental in organizing protests and sit-ins at Howard Johnson locations in multiple states.

The city of Durham, North Carolina, became notable as a focus for action against segregated restaurants and hotels, including Howard Johnson's. On 12 August 1962, attorney and civil rights activist Floyd McKissick initiated the first of multiple rallies and demonstrations against segregated establishments in Durham, including the Howard Johnson's restaurant on Chapel Hill Boulevard, culminating in multiple protests on 18–20 May 1963 resulting in mass arrests as well as an eventual rapprochement with the city government. Future senator and presidential candidate Bernie Sanders, while a student at the University of Chicago in 1962, helped organize picketing of a Howard Johnson's location in Cicero, Illinois, during his time as a student activist for CORE.

By 7 December 1962, the Howard Johnson Company issued a statement to the press opposing racial segregation in its restaurants, citing its corporate policy against discrimination: "Where it has been possible to change the operation of our company-operated restaurants in the South to conform to our national policy of service without discrimination, this has been done." The letter, written in conjunction with CORE and the NAACP, praised the organizations and aligned company policy with their outlook that segregation was "not defensible."

Howard Johnson's restaurants by the 1960s were known to be accommodating to members of the gay community, particularly in metropolitan New York. On April 21, 1966, at the Howard Johnson's in the Greenwich Village neighborhood, Dick Leitsch, Craig Rodwell, and John Timmins, all members of the New York chapter of the Mattachine Society, an early American gay rights group, patronized the restaurant as part of a 'Sip-In' demonstration in protest of New York liquor laws that prevented serving gay customers. The men were served drinks without incident at the restaurant; they later visited Julius' Bar where they were denied service, eventually leading to changes in the laws. In the late 1960s, gay liberation activist Marsha P. Johnson chose that drag queen name with the surname Johnson inspired by the Howard Johnson's restaurant on 42nd Street.

=== New chains and a changing public ===
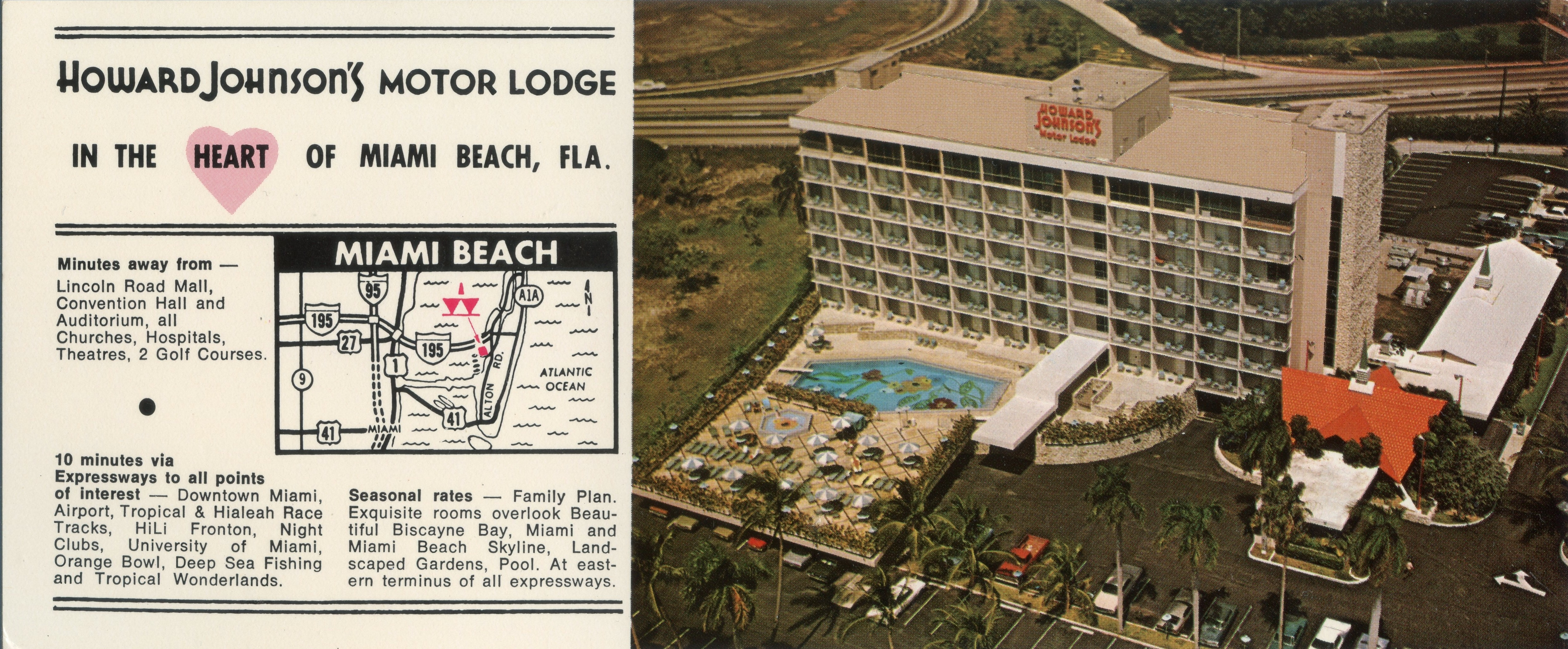
Historic promotional image of the Howard Johnson's Motor Lodge in Miami Beach

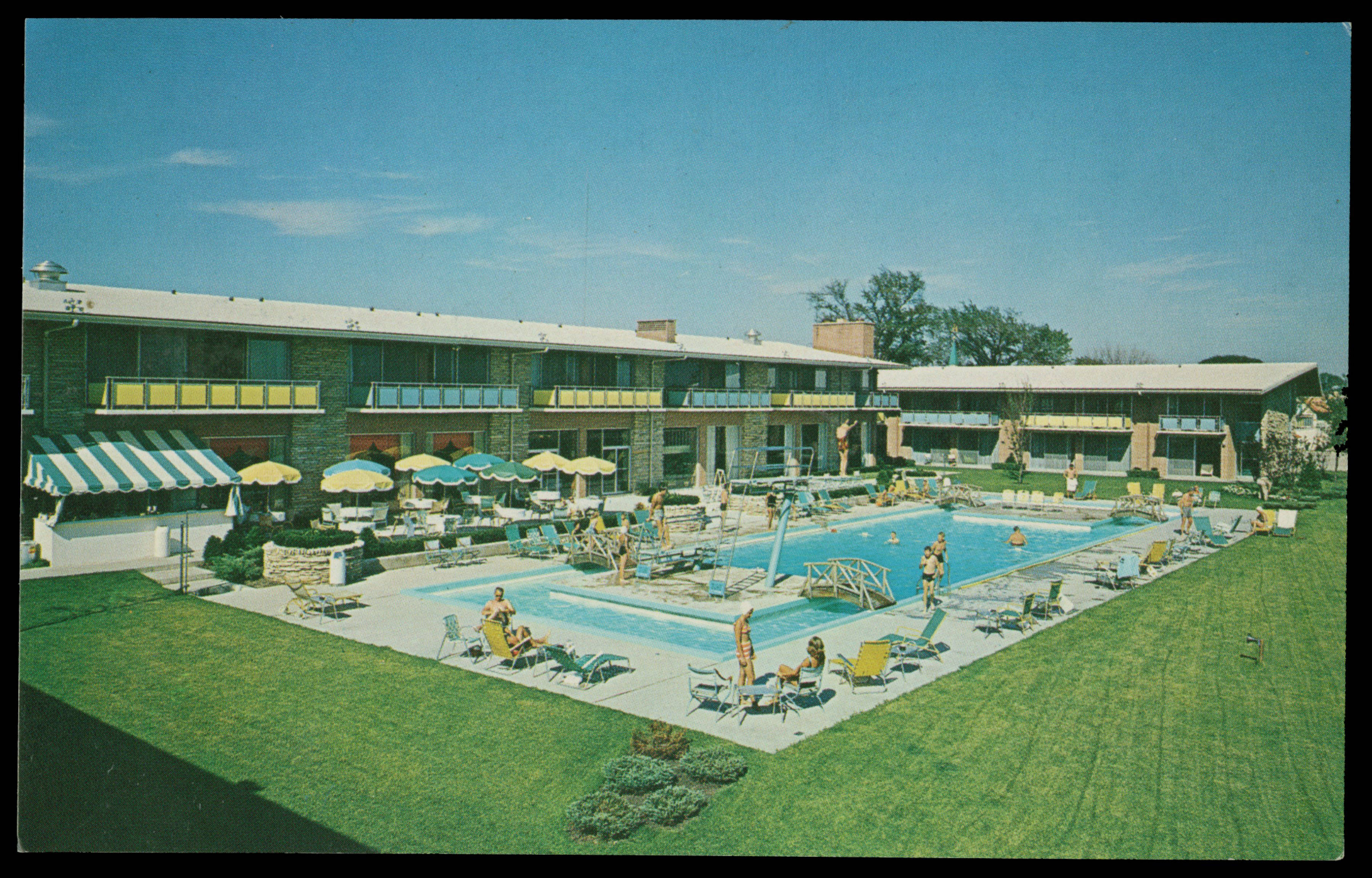
Historic promotional image of the Howard Johnson's Motor Lodge in Chicago

In 1969, Johnson again tried a new restaurant concept, Ground Round. Although not a Howard Johnson's restaurant, the Ground Round chain was company-owned and franchised, thus increasing the Howard Johnson Company's profit.

The 28 flavors of ice cream and piggybank-sensitive meal prices made it possible to lure families. The company also started some child-friendly promotions, including a birthday club in which children who signed up in advance were sent birthday cards redeemable for a free meal, a cake, and in some locations, balloons and lollipops. Children’s menus were an attractive staple of Howard Johnson’s. In addition to offering kid-friendly food at lower prices, industrial designer John Alcott’s firm created a variety of menus that kept the kids entertained. Some included maps of the United States, and one was a guide to the metric system. Another menu could be converted to a mask if a string was added. Howard Johnson’s also held contests. If a person submitted proof via a check-off coupon that they had sampled all 28 flavors of ice cream, the next ice cream cone was free.

In the early 1970s, the company suffered from several infamous incidents at its properties. The first of these was a fire, set on 23 July 1971 on the 12th floor of the Howard Johnson's Motor Lodge in New Orleans' Central Business District. Six people were killed by smoke and toxic gases, including four members of a visiting family and a security guard who was attempting to rescue guests. On 7 January 1973, Mark Essex used the same hotel's roof as a sniper's perch, killing nine people (including three New Orleans Police Department officers) and injuring 12 others. On 8 November 1974, singer-actress Connie Francis was attacked at the Howard Johnson's Lodge in Jericho, New York. She was raped and nearly suffocated after her attacker threw a heavy mattress on her. She subsequently sued the motel chain for its lapse in security and won a $2.5 million judgment, one of the largest such judgments at the time. This incident led to significant reforms in hotel security. For example, upon learning of this incident, Norwegian inventor Tor Sørnes was inspired to invent the first keycard lock.

Because of the oil embargo of 1973, the Howard Johnson's restaurants and motor lodges, which received 85% of revenue from travelers, lost profits when Americans could not afford long trips or frequent vacations. Rather than promoting the restaurants to travelers, management knew it had to focus on nearby population centers. Also, the company model of serving pre-made food with high-quality ingredients in traditional dining rooms was costly when compared to the innovations introduced by fast food outlets like McDonald's, which designed its products and restaurants to appeal to families with younger children. Around this time, the chain introduced "Hojo Cola" and other private-label sodas, which disappointed some customers who preferred familiar products such as Coca-Cola or Pepsi.

By 1975, the Howard Johnson Company had more than 1,000 restaurants and more than 500 motor lodges in 42 states and Canada. The company reached its peak that year, but the late 1970s marked the beginning of the end for the Howard Johnson Company. H. B. Johnson attempted to streamline company operations and cut costs, such as serving cheaper food and having fewer employees. This strategy was unsuccessful because patrons compared this new era of Howard Johnson's restaurants and motor lodges unfavorably to the services they had previously come to know. In a further effort to make the company more successful and profitable, Johnson created other concepts, such as HoJo Campgrounds and 3 Penny Inns for lodging, as well as Deli Baker Ice Cream Maker, and Chatt's for restaurants. All of these concepts failed, hastening the company's demise. Eventually, the last 15 Red Coach Grills were sold in 1983 to a company executive who closed them.

=== Changes in ownership ===
In 1979, Johnson accepted an acquisition bid of more than $630 million from Imperial Group PLC of London, England. Imperial obtained 1,040 restaurants (75% company owned/25% franchised) and 520 motor lodges (75% franchised/25% company-owned). In 1981 Imperial recruited G. Michael Hostage, then CEO of Continental Baking Company and formerly executive vice president of Marriott Corporation, to replace Johnson as CEO. After four years, despite progress in a turnaround, Imperial reversed course and sold the company. Having declined to entertain Hostage's proposal to lead a leveraged buyout, Imperial employed Goldman Sachs who, with Hostage's assistance, sold the company to Marriott in 1986. In a contemporaneous transaction, Marriott sold the motor lodge business and the Howard Johnson trademark to Prime Motor Inns, a New Jersey company.

Marriott was interested in the company-owned restaurants for real estate. Marriott already owned Big Boy Restaurants and Roy Rogers Restaurants. In 1982, it acquired Host International, which had operated a number of highway rest stops. Many of the established Howard Johnson sites were in prime highway locations which could be profitably converted to Big Boy or various fast food banners. As Marriott quickly demolished the company-owned restaurants or converted them to the Bob's Big Boy restaurant chain, the number of Howard Johnson's restaurants remaining circa 1985 was sharply reduced. Only the franchised restaurants remained untouched.

Marriott left all company-owned and franchised motor lodges untouched, as the deal called for them to be sold a year later (in 1986) to Prime Motors Inns, an existing franchisee with 63 motels.

=== Development since 1990 ===
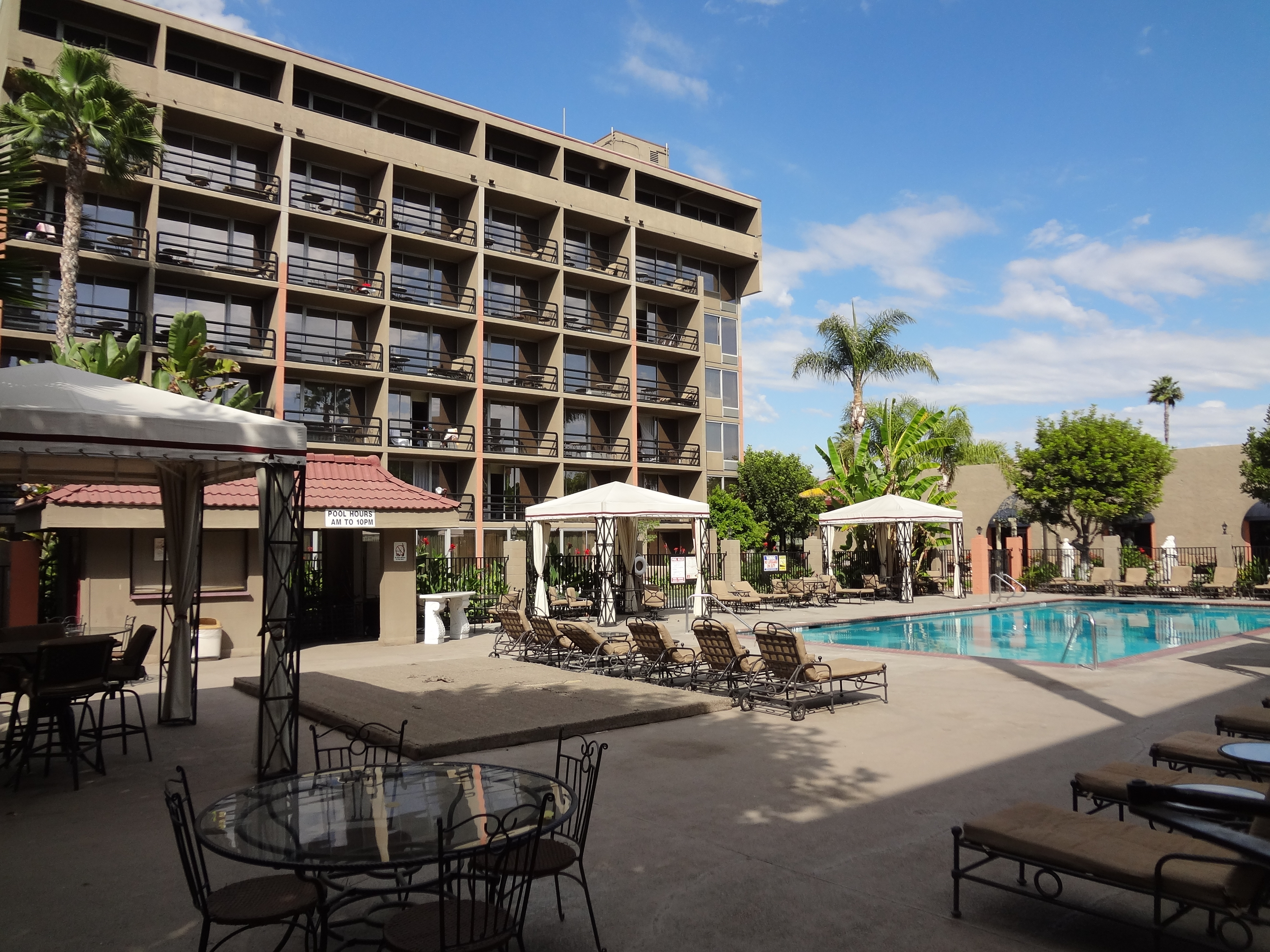
Howard Johnson in Los Angeles

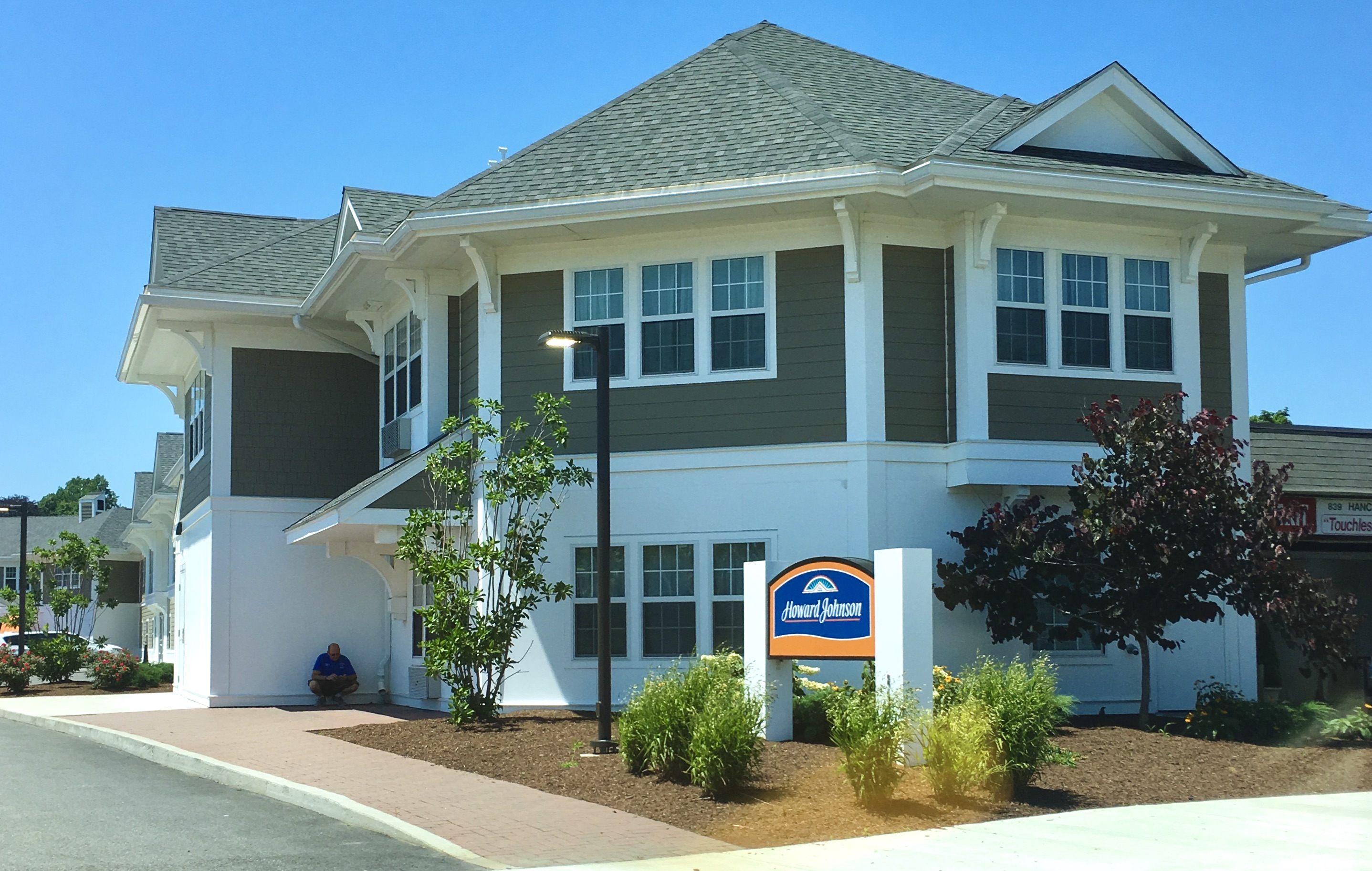
Howard Johnson in Quincy, Massachusetts

Prime Motors Inns continued to preserve the lodges, just as Marriott had, until weak hotel and real estate markets caused it to sell off its assets and cease operations in 1990. Those involved with the company owned and franchised motor lodges banded together and formed the Howard Johnson Acquisition Corporation. They successfully obtained all the rights to operate and maintain the company-owned and franchised lodges. With these rights maintained, they changed their name to "Howard Johnson International Incorporated," which became a subsidiary of "Hospitality Franchise Systems Incorporated," which eventually merged with other companies to form Cendant. In the late 1990s, the Howard Johnson's Candy Factory and Executive Offices in Wollaston were purchased and renovated by the Eastern Nazarene College to form the Adams Executive Center.

In 2006, Cendant split itself into Wyndham Worldwide and three other companies. Wyndham operated the Howard Johnson brand under several "tiers" based on price, level of amenities, and services offered. Under Cendant/Wyndham, the chain became a parking place for franchise conversions, which were existing independent motels which had been renovated and added to the chain in order to provide them with access to a nationally recognized name and central reservation infrastructure. As these properties were not originally constructed as Howard Johnson sites, they lacked distinctive architecture; some locations had no restaurant at all. Howard Johnson Express Inns, Howard Johnson Inns, Howard Johnson Hotels, and Howard Johnson Plaza Hotels range from limited-service motels to full-service properties with on-site concierges and business centers. Howard Johnson began offering a "Rise 'N' Dine" continental breakfast at some economy-limited service locations. The chain abolished the multiple price tiers by 2015.

== Locations ==
Despite the hotel chain surviving into the 21st century, its number of locations has significantly dropped in recent years (there are fewer than 130 Howard Johnson hotels left in the United States, where the chain originated). As of May 2024, there are combined 280 Howard Johnson branded properties with the vast majority located in the United States and China with further hotels in Canada, Mexico, Cambodia, India, Indonesia, South Korea, Saudi Arabia, the United Arab Emirates, Argentina, Chile, Colombia, Ecuador and Paraguay.

== Demise of Howard Johnson's restaurants ==
While the Howard Johnson Company-owned and franchised motor lodges survived since being sold by the Howard Johnson Company in 1979, the restaurants did not.

=== 1980s: Spun-off as independent ===
Because Marriott eliminated all the company-owned restaurants, the owners of the franchised restaurants feared elimination and banded together in 1986 to create "Franchise Associates Incorporated" (FAI). In 1986, Marriott gave FAI the right to operate and maintain Howard Johnson's restaurants.

In 1987, FAI chairman George Carter acknowledged that "We have the concept, but it desperately needs to be modernized, internally and externally. Howard Johnson was allowed to become tired and stale. We must get rid of that plastic image... Anything can be salvageable if a great deal of time and money and effort is put in it. And Howard Johnson needs all those same things.""

While the Howard Johnson's restaurant chain was preserved, FAI did not have enough money to expand to new locations or revamp the brand. With the exception of one Howard Johnson's ice cream parlor in Puerto Rico, FAI never opened a new restaurant or expanded the chain.

=== 1990s: Struggling under FAI ===
In 1990, an existing restaurant in Canton, Massachusetts, was remodeled as a prototype for a new era of Howard Johnson's restaurants, but the concept failed, and after less than a decade of operation, the prototype restaurant closed in the spring of 2000. The chain revamped 25% of the menu and created new signage, but the chain continued to lose ground to mass-market fast food operations. When Cendant acquired the Howard Johnson's motor lodges, they offered to work together with FAI to ensure the expansion of the restaurant chain. By March 1995, FAI's official directory listed just 84 restaurants remaining in the US and Canada.

=== 2000s: Sharp decline ===
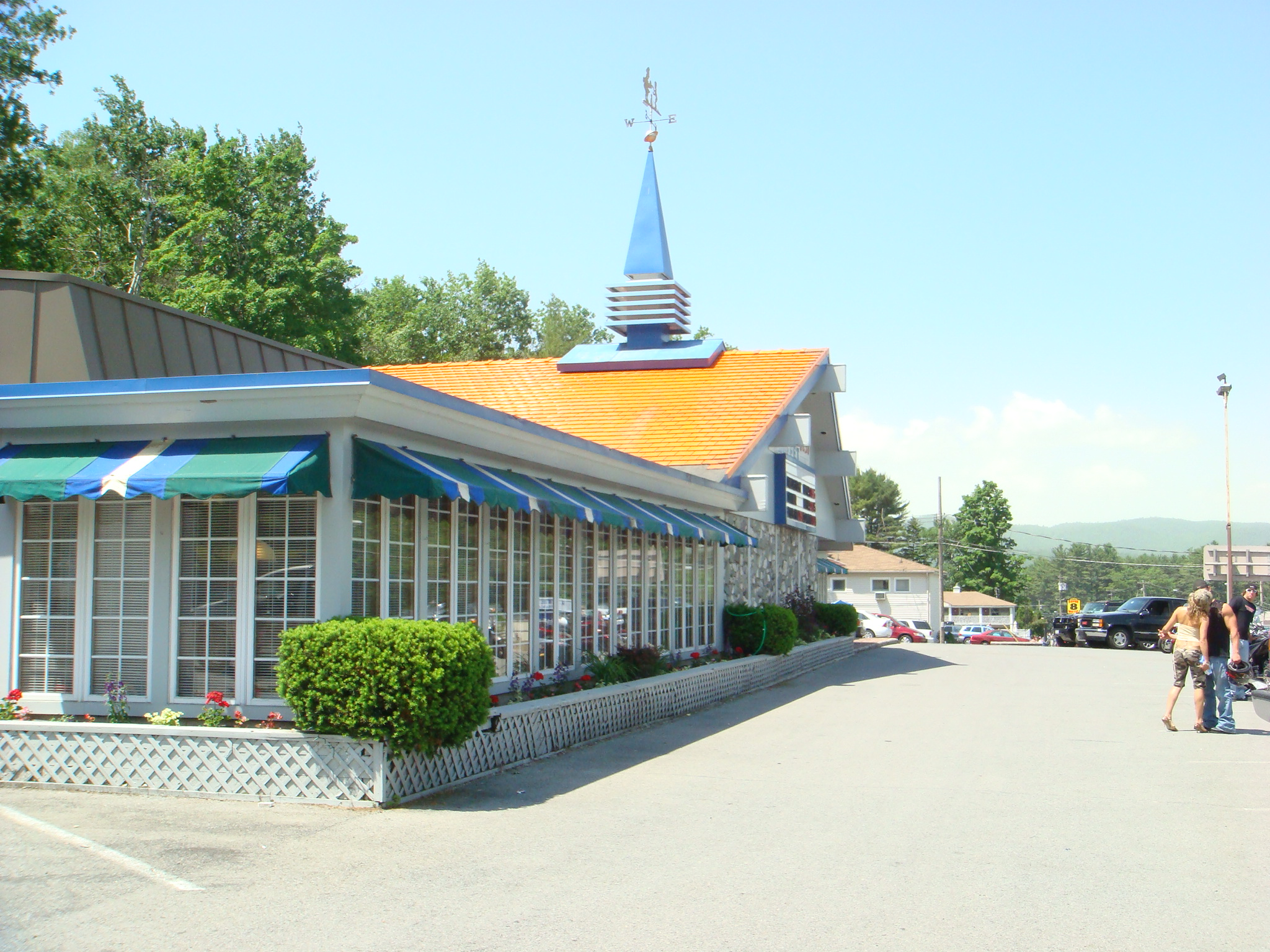
The last remaining Howard Johnson's restaurant, in Lake George, New York, in 2007. This restaurant closed in 2022.

By 2005, there were fewer than eight surviving restaurants. FAI ceased operations in 2005, and Cendant acquired the rights to operate and maintain the remaining Howard Johnson's restaurants. In 2006, Cendant sold them to La Mancha Group LLC, which had proposed an aggressive expansion of the restaurant chain that never materialized. After the Waterbury, Connecticut, restaurant became The Brass House Restaurant in April 2007, only three locations remained. Cendant split into four smaller companies in 2006; its hotel group became Wyndham Worldwide while other pieces were spun off separately to become Avis Budget Group, Realogy, Travelport and Affinion Group.

The Howard Johnson-branded frozen foods line was discontinued after Fairfield Farms Kitchens shut down its Brockton, Massachusetts plant in 2006 and America's Kitchen of Atlanta, Georgia shut down in May 2008.

=== 2010s: Fading out ===
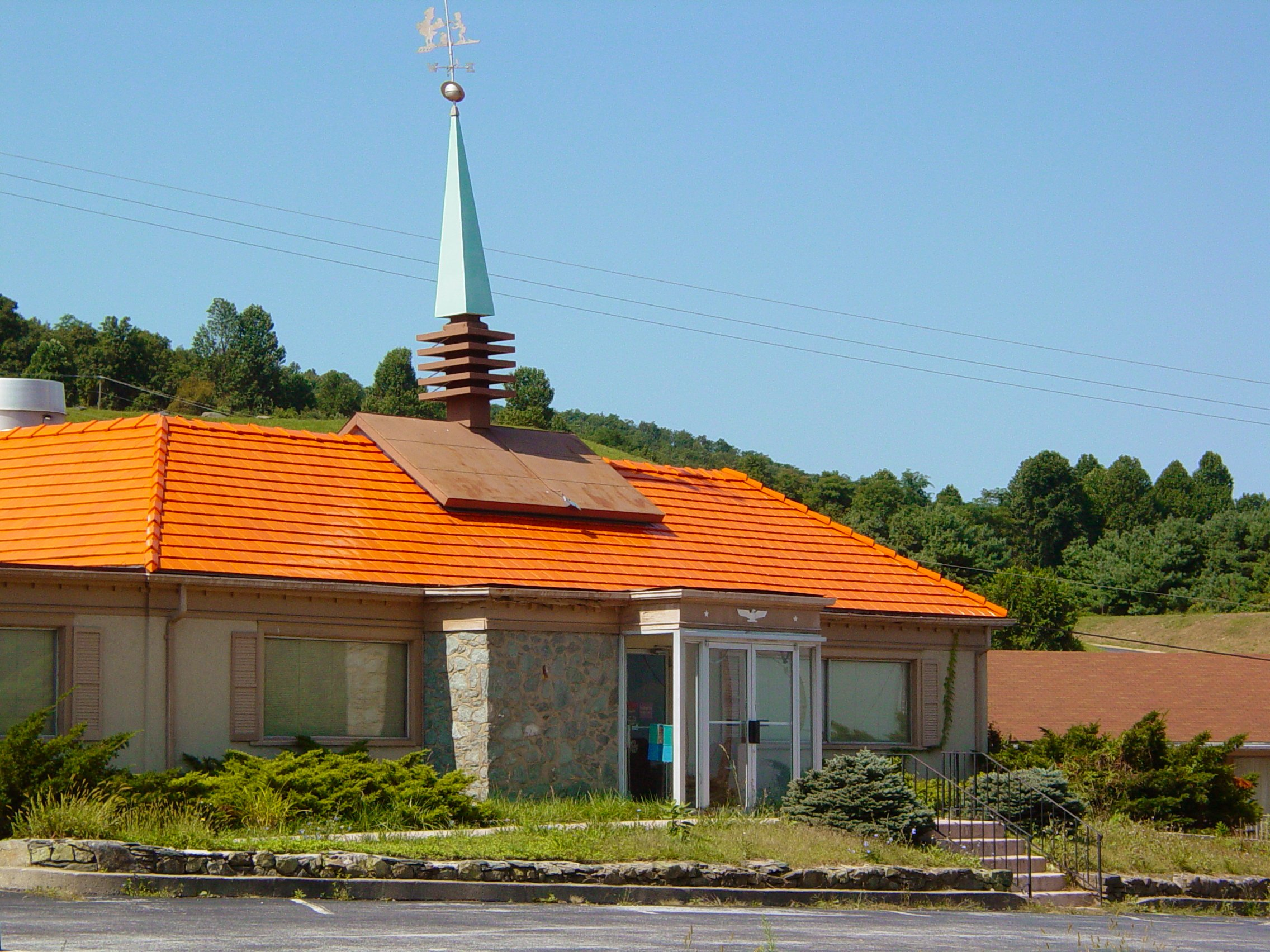
A defunct Howard Johnson's restaurant in Afton Mountain, Virginia, painted in 1970s "environmental" color scheme, 2003.

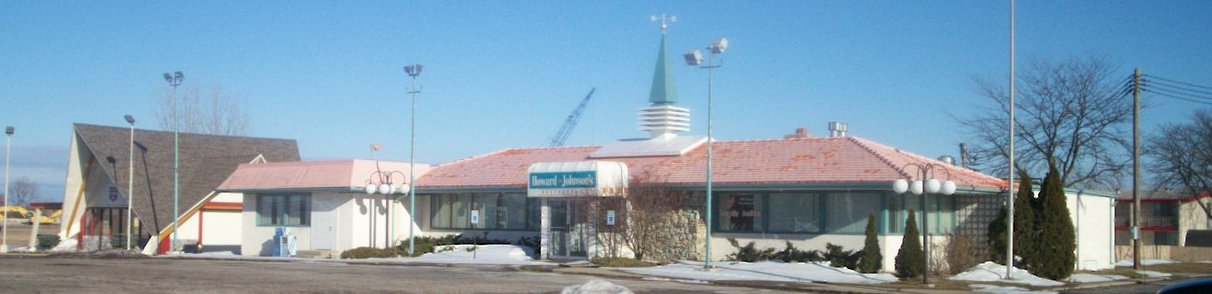
A defunct and since demolished Howard Johnson's restaurant in Bay City, Michigan, 2011.

In spring 2012, one of the last three original Howard Johnson's restaurants closed, in Lake George, and was listed for sale. Television personality, chef and author Rachael Ray once worked at that site while living in Lake George as a teenager. By 2013, only two original restaurants remained open, but the Bangor location no longer had the distinctive orange roof. While the hotel franchise’s HoJo Hotel Plaza locations did include a restaurant, there was no requirement that these replicate menus, format or branding of the former Howard Johnson restaurant chain.

With La Mancha Group LLC no longer active, Wyndham Hotel Group acquired the rights to the HoJo's food business as well as the Howard Johnson hotel chain. In 2013, Wyndham proposed a brand reinvigoration which would have brought back select flavors of ice cream, adopted a new logo, phased out the multiple branding tiers, gave the properties a facelift and redesigned the chain as a lower-midscale brand starting in 2015. Wyndham did eventually implement retro-inspired guest room renovations, but most other plans, including those involving food and restaurant operations, were scrapped.

On January 10, 2015, the former Howard Johnson's Lake George restaurant reopened as the "Lake George Family Restaurant", after the location’s lease was transferred from its original owners, DeSantis Enterprises, to John Larock in August 2014. Larock took advantage of a grandfather clause to reopen the restaurant as a Howard Johnson's, bringing the number of restaurants back up to three.

On March 31, 2015, the Lake Placid, NY Howard Johnson's closed, leaving only two locations remaining. On September 6, 2016, the Bangor restaurant (the last continuously operating restaurant from the original chain) closed; this was the last remaining location out of the original 1,000-plus. By 2016, only the Lake George restaurant remained.

=== 2020s: Final closure ===
Despite the Lake George restaurant's claim as "The Last One Standing", its authenticity as a true Howard Johnson's restaurant was questioned due to its dissimilar menu and many negative reviews. A new from-the-ground-up operation, it lacked kitchen staff and crew formerly connected or experienced with the Howard Johnson's Restaurant chain. While it retained an original building and trademark name, it had no official connection with Wyndham or the defunct FAI, operating entirely as an independent entity.

In January 2017, the Lake George property went up for sale, and redevelopment projects were proposed for the site. On October 12, 2017, owner John Larock was arrested and convicted of the sexual harassment of multiple female employees, and on October 31, 2018, began serving a six-month jail sentence. The restaurant continued to operate with Larock as its owner, but was only open sporadically, with limited days and hours.

In March 2022, the Lake George restaurant permanently closed.
