= Wootten =

Wootten is a surname. Notable people with the surname include:

- Ben Wootten (born 1969), New Zealand graphic designer, worked on the Lord of the Rings films
- Jess Wootten (born 1983), Australian bootmaker
- George Wootten (1893–1970), Australian soldier
- Morgan Wootten (1931–2020), American basketball coach
- Hal Wootten (1922–2021), Australian lawyer and judge of the Supreme Court of New South Wales
- Bayard Wootten (1875–1959), American photographer

== See also ==
- Wootton (disambiguation)
- Wooten
- Wootten firebox
- Woottens Luxury Travel, a coach operator in Buckinghamshire, England
