= Woolsgrove =

Village in Devon, England

Coordinates: 50.80°N 03.71°W

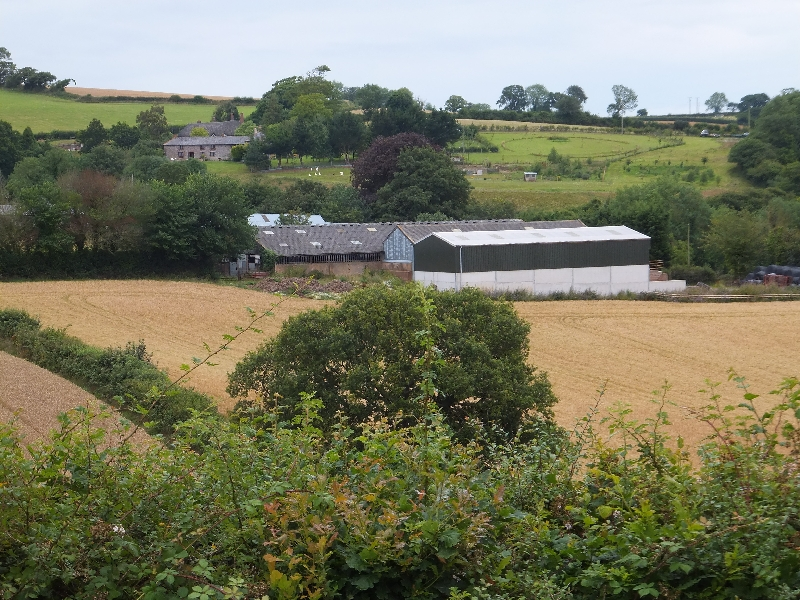
- Barns at Woolsgrove

- Location within Devon
- OS grid reference: SS7902
- Shire county: Devon
- Region: South West
- Country: England
- Sovereign state: United Kingdom
- Police: Devon and Cornwall
- Fire: Devon and Somerset
- Ambulance: South Western

Woolsgrove is a set of farmhouses in Devon, England, some 3 miles (5 km) north-west of Crediton. The settlement is part of the Sandford civil parish, and is represented at the UK Parliament as part of the Central Devon Constituency.
