= Workhouse Hill =

Hamlet in Essex, England

Coordinates: 51.950°N 0.901°E

- Location within Essex
- OS grid reference: TM110215
- Civil parish: Boxted
- District: Colchester
- Shire county: Essex
- Region: East
- Country: England
- Sovereign state: United Kingdom
- Post town: Colchester
- Postcode district: CO4
- Dialling code: 01206
- Police: Essex
- Fire: Essex
- Ambulance: East of England
- UK Parliament: Harwich and North Essex

Workhouse Hill is a hamlet in the civil parish of Boxted, in the Colchester district, in the English county of Essex.
