= Kyle Wooten =

American musician

Kyle Herbert Wooten (August 28, 1897 – July 31, 1935) was an American harmonica player during the 1920s and 1930s best known for the choking blues. Born in Lumber City, Georgia, he was considered part of the backwoods scene, a subgenre of Appalachian music, and incorporated imitations of animals and imitations of inanimate sounds in his play.

He died in Lumber City of tuberculosis, aged 38.
