= Wooten =

Wooten is a surname. Notable people with the surname include:

- Andrew Wooten (born 1989), German-American professional soccer player
- Brian Wooten (fl. 1982–1997), American musician
- Chandler Wooten (born 1999), American football player
- Dudley G. Wooten (1860–1929), American politician
- Gene Wooten (1953–2001), American musician
- Jacob Wooten (born 1997), American pole vaulter
- John Wooten (born 1936), American football player
- Kenny Wooten (born 1998), American basketball player
- Kyle Wooten (1897–1935), American musician
- Lynn Perry Wooten, American academic administrator
- Mike Wooten (football player) (born 1962), American football player
- Mike Wooten (trooper), Alaska State trooper tied to the Sarah Palin Public Safety Commissioner dismissal
- Ron Wooten (born 1959), American football player
- Roy Wilfred Wooten (born 1957), better known as Future Man, American musician
- Shawn Wooten (born 1972), American baseball player
- Thomas Dudley Wooten (1829–1906), American physician and Confederate veteran
- Tito Wooten (born 1971), American football player
- Victor Wooten (born 1964), American musician

== See also ==
- Carl Wooten Field, stadium of Oklahoma Panhandle State University
- Goodall Wooten House, historic home in Austin, Texas
- Wooten desk
- Wooton (disambiguation)
- Wootten
