= Woolpit Green =

Hamlet in Suffolk, England

Coordinates: 52.216°N 0.891°E

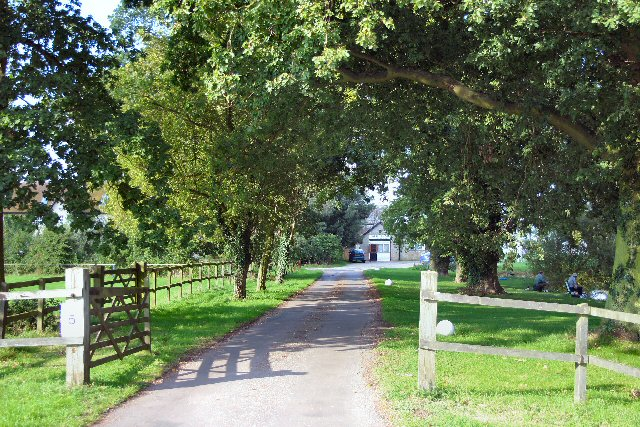
- Grange Farm, Woolpit Green

- Location within Suffolk
- OS grid reference: TL9761
- Shire county: Suffolk
- Region: East
- Country: England
- Sovereign state: United Kingdom
- Police: Suffolk
- Fire: Suffolk
- Ambulance: East of England

Woolpit Green is a village in Suffolk, England near the village of Woolpit.
