= Woolgarston =

Village in Dorset, England

Coordinates: 50°37′57″N 2°01′19″W

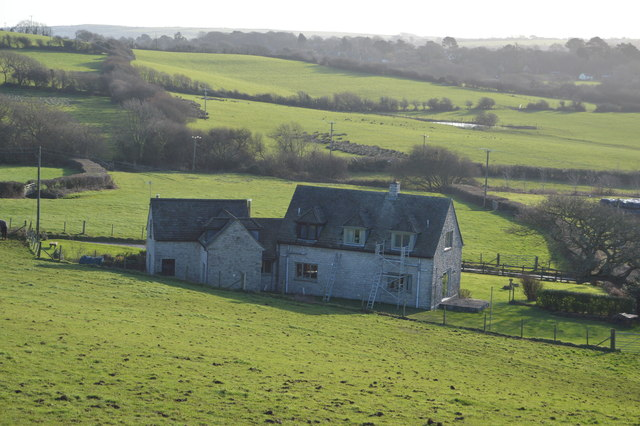
- Farmhouse at Little Woolsgarten Farm

- Location within Dorset
- OS grid reference: SY9881
- Unitary authority: Dorset
- Ceremonial county: Dorset
- Region: South West
- Country: England
- Sovereign state: United Kingdom
- Police: Dorset
- Fire: Dorset and Wiltshire
- Ambulance: South Western

Woolgarston is a village in Dorset, England.
