= Thomas Wotton =

Thomas Wotton may refer to:

- Thomas Wotton (surgeon) (1582–1669), with first colonists to Jamestown, Virginia
- Thomas Wotton (genealogist) (died 1766), compiler of The English Baronetage
- Thomas Wotton (sheriff) (1521–1587), sheriff of Kent
- Thomas Wotton, 2nd Baron Wotton (1587–1630), English peer
