= Woolpit Heath =

Hamlet in Suffolk, England

Coordinates: 52.215°N 0.907°E

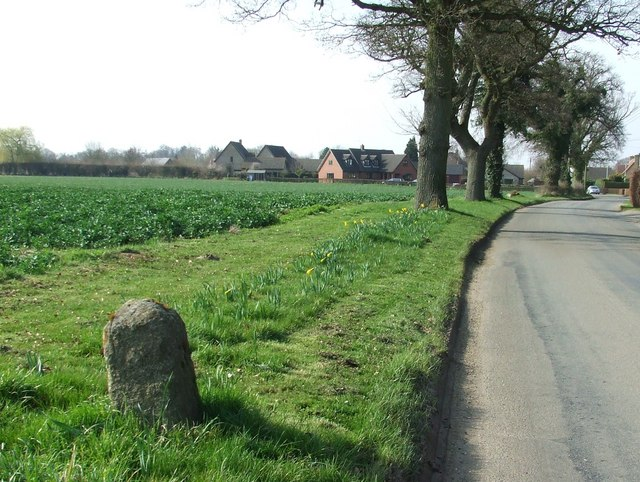

- Location within Suffolk
- OS grid reference: TL9861
- District: Mid Suffolk
- Shire county: Suffolk
- Region: East
- Country: England
- Sovereign state: United Kingdom
- Police: Suffolk
- Fire: Suffolk
- Ambulance: East of England

Woolpit Heath is a settlement in Suffolk, England near the village of Woolpit.
