= Howard Deering Johnson =

American businessman

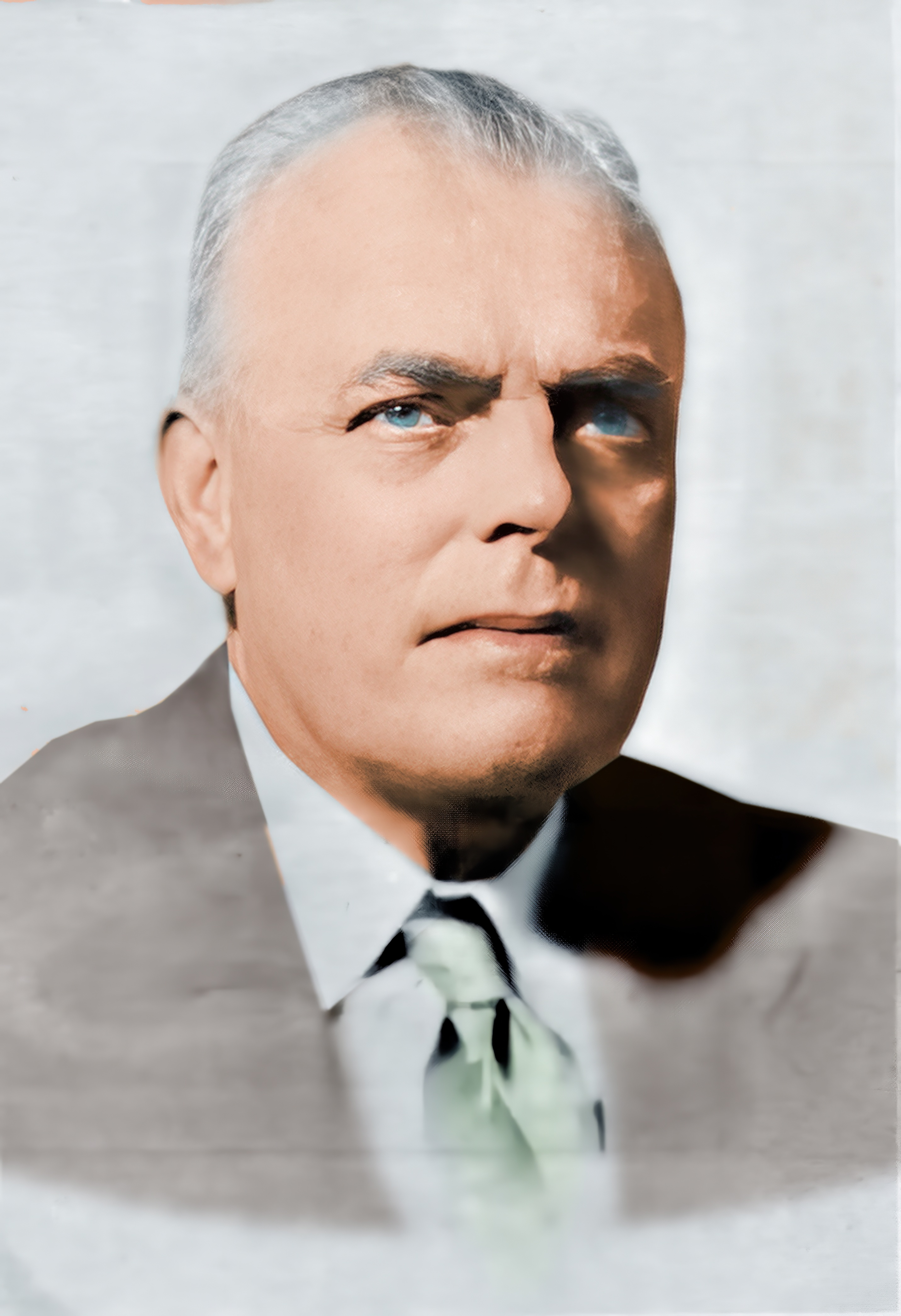
- H. D. Johnson in 1955
- Born: February 2, 1897; Boston, Massachusetts, US
- Died: June 20, 1972 (aged 75); Milton, Massachusetts, US
- Occupations: Entrepreneur; Hospitality industry executive
- Employer: Howard Johnson's

Howard Deering Johnson (February 2, 1897 – June 20, 1972) was an American entrepreneur, businessman, and the founder of an American chain of restaurants and motels under one company of the same name, Howard Johnson's.

== Early life ==
Howard Johnson was born in Boston, Massachusetts, and only finished elementary school because he began to work in his father's cigar business. He served during World War I in the American Expeditionary Force in France. His father died and left him a business that was in debt. He ran the cigar store until 1924 when he liquidated it, but he could not erase the $10,000 debt. He entered the restaurant industry to pay off the loan that remained after he sold the cigar venture.

== Career ==
In 1925, he bought a small soda shop in the Wollaston neighborhood of Quincy, Massachusetts. He enhanced the quality of the ice cream by buying a recipe from a pushcart vendor for $300. It doubled the butterfat of the product and used only natural flavorings. He used hand-cranked makers in his basement and by 1928 was grossing about $240,000 from ice cream sold in the store and nearby beaches.

Johnson expanded operations by opening more stores and started selling food items such as hamburgers and frankfurters at his original store. In 1929, he opened a second restaurant in Quincy. This sit-down outlet had a broader menu and laid the groundwork for future expansion.

In 1935, Howard Johnson teamed up with a local businessman, Reginald Sprague, and created the first modern restaurant franchise. The idea was new in that era: let an operator use the name, food, supplies, and logo, in exchange for a fee. The business of "HoJo" chain restaurants rapidly expanded, and he also entered the lodging industry.

Johnson's two children, Howard Brennan Johnson (1933-2024) and daughter Dorothy Johnson (1930-2013) were featured in highway billboards, when they were six and eight years old respectively. The tag line, "We love our daddy's ice cream!" was in the ad.

After enjoying success with the business, Johnson owned a 60-foot (18 m) yacht and he collected paintings, but he said his hobby was "to talk and eat food." Not surprisingly, his favorite food was ice cream, which he maintained was "not fattening." He ate at least one cone a day, and he kept 10 distinct flavors in the freezers of his seven-room Manhattan penthouse and at his home in Milton, Massachusetts.

In later life, Johnson recalled that he had no interest in or time for anything but building his business, which he was quoted as saying "was my only form of recreation." He continued, "I never played golf. I never played tennis. I never did anything after I left school. I ate, slept, and thought of nothing but the business."

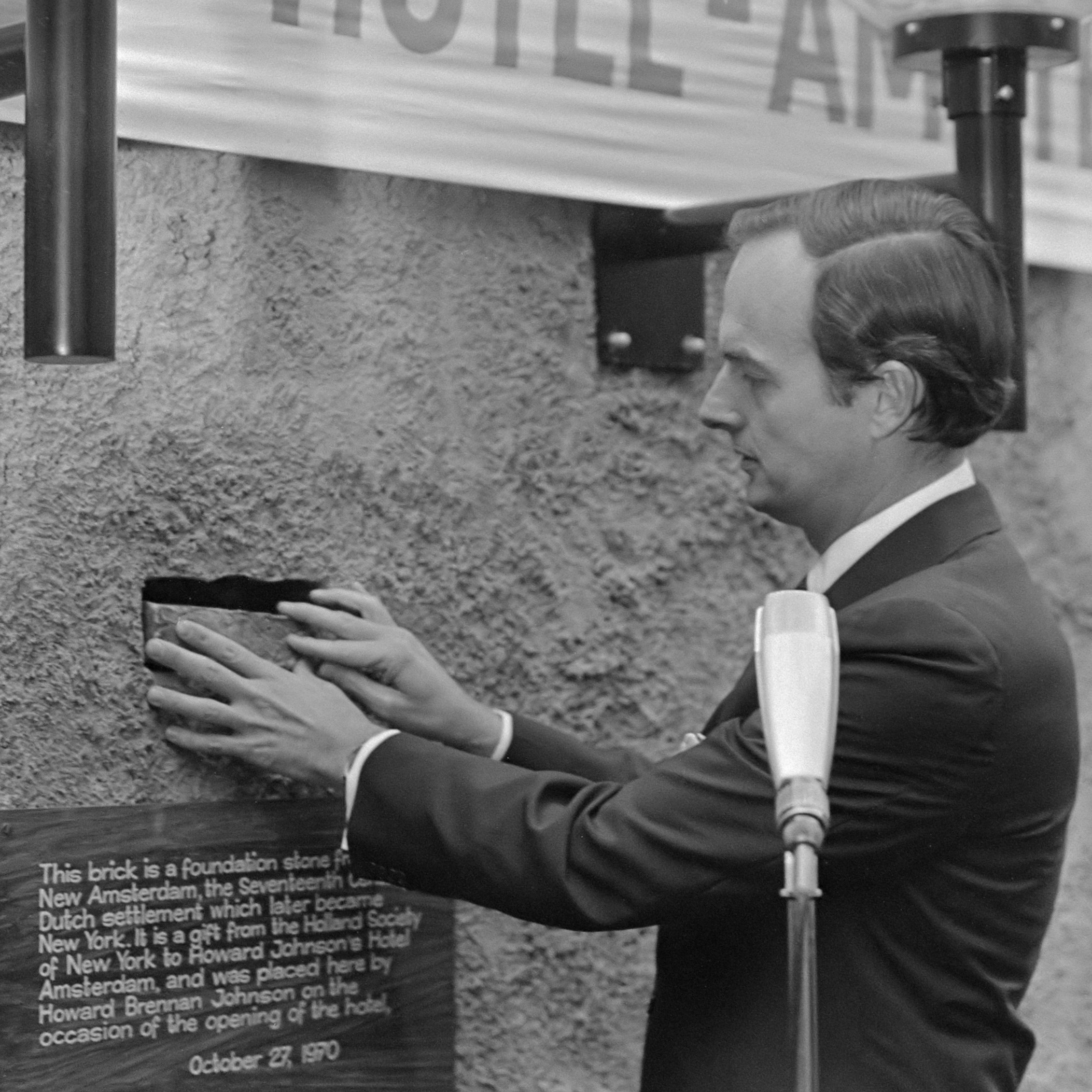
Howard Brennan Johnson opening a hotel in Amsterdam (1970)

Johnson retired in 1959, leaving the company to his son, Howard Brennan "Bud" Johnson. Although he had transferred leadership to Bud, Howard continued to monitor his restaurants for cleanliness and proper food preparation. He would arrive unannounced in a chauffeured black Cadillac bearing the license plate HJ-28, which stood for his initials and the 28 ice cream flavors sold at the restaurants. Bud Johnson sold the family business in 1979, and left the company in 1981.

== Personal life ==
Johnson was married four times (Dorothy Frances Smith m. 1928 and d. 1930 and Marjorie Christine Smith m. 1949), fathering at least two children.

== Death and legacy ==
Johnson died on June 20, 1972, at the age of 75. He is buried in Milton Cemetery in Milton, Massachusetts.

Johnson's novel idea of centralized buying and using a commissary system to prepare menu items for distribution are part of his legacy to the restaurant industry. He also helped shape the way Americans dined out by locating his restaurants by major roads, maintaining a family-friendly atmosphere, and serving meals characterized today as comfort food. At one time, Howard Johnson was the largest commercial food supplier and lodging operator in the United States. Johnson's innovations ensured a uniform consistency and quality to the food served, as well as lower costs. However, a plethora of new competitors and Johnson's continued focus on cutting costs contributed to the eventual failure of the Howard Johnson restaurant brand.

In 1999, Johnson was inducted into the Hospitality Industry Hall of Honor, which recognizes the world's most successful hospitality interests and most recognizable brands.
