= Woolford's Water =

Village in Dorset, England

Coordinates: 50.84°N 02.44°W

- Location within Dorset
- OS grid reference: ST6905
- Unitary authority: Dorset
- Ceremonial county: Dorset
- Region: South West
- Country: England
- Sovereign state: United Kingdom
- Police: Dorset
- Fire: Dorset and Wiltshire
- Ambulance: South Western

Woolford's Water is a village in Dorset, England.
