= Woollensbrook =

Hamlet in Hertfordshire, England

Coordinates: 51.77°N 00.03°W

- Location within Hertfordshire
- OS grid reference: TL3610
- Shire county: Hertfordshire
- Region: East
- Country: England
- Sovereign state: United Kingdom
- Post town: Hoddesdon
- Postcode district: EN11
- Police: Hertfordshire
- Fire: Hertfordshire
- Ambulance: East of England

Woollensbrook is a hamlet in Hertfordshire, England. It is in the town of Hoddesdon.
