= North Wootton =

North Wootton may refer to:

- North Wootton, Dorset
- North Wootton, Norfolk
- North Wootton, Somerset
