= Woottens Luxury Travel =

Coach operating company in Buckinghamshire, England

Woottens

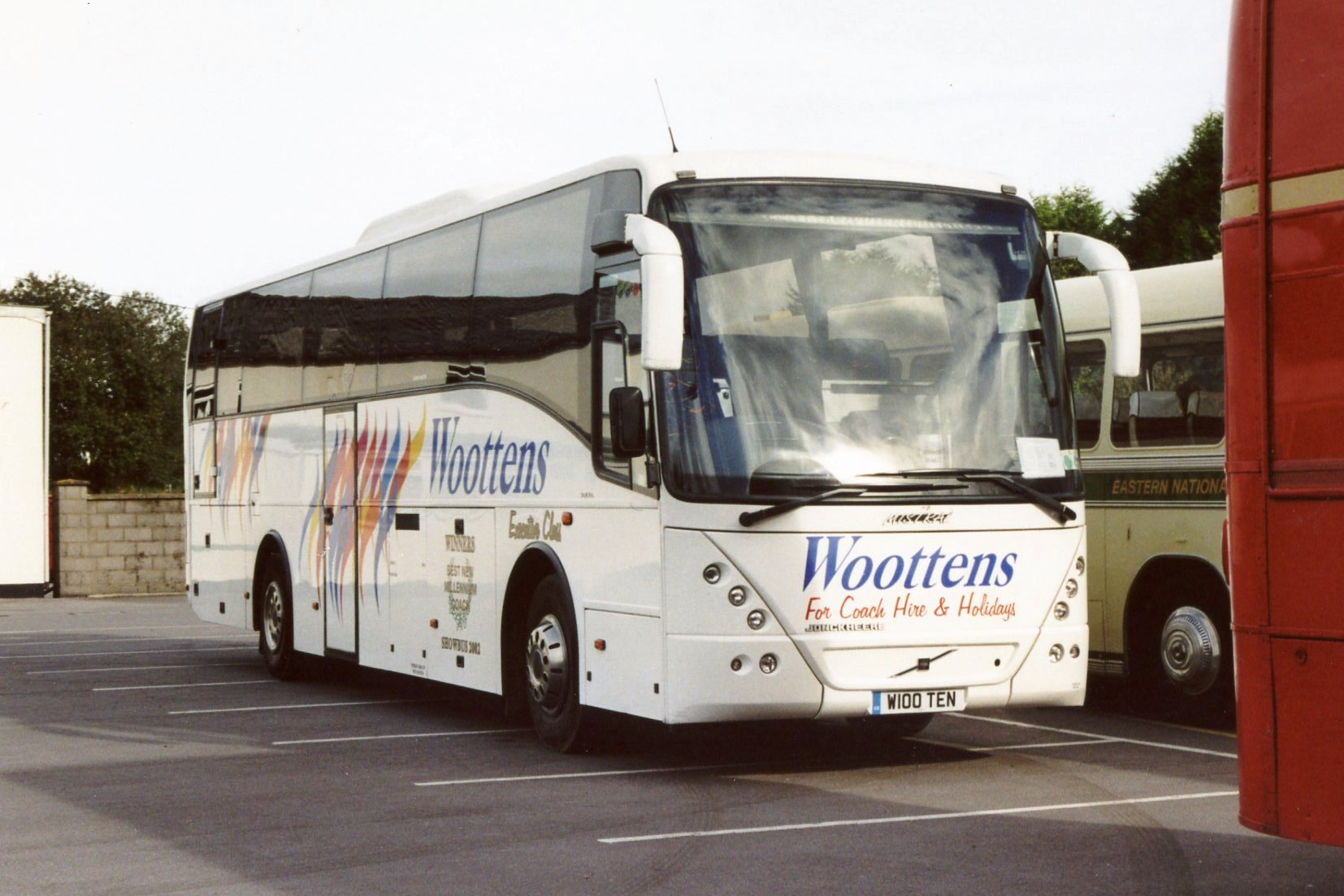
- Founded: 1999
- Defunct: 2012
- Headquarters: Lycrome Road, Lye Green, Chesham
- Service type: Buses, Coaches

Woottens Luxury Travel was a coach operating company based in Buckinghamshire, England. It was formed in 1999 by Michael Wootten, and between 2008 and 2011 operated local bus services under the name Tiger Line. The company became part of the Bowen Travel Group in 2011, and closed down after Bowen entered administration in 2012.

== History ==
Woottens Luxury Travel was founded in April 1999 by father and son Nick and Michael Wootten with two coaches and a small depot in Princes Risborough. School contracts for both Oxfordshire County Council and Buckinghamshire County Council were won in the first year, and in August 1999 the company moved to a purpose-built depot in Lye Green, near Chesham.

In April 2007 the operations of Westways of High Wycombe, an operator established since 1990, were acquired, increasing the amount of day trip and brochure holiday work dramatically. Also in 2007, the company was shortlisted for the Route One Coach Operator of the Year award. The Tiger Line commercial bus operation was launched in July 2008.

A 75% stake in Woottens was acquired by the Bowen Travel Group in June 2011. Bowen Travel Group entered administration in October 2012 due to cashflow issues, and Woottens ceased operation.

=== Tiger Line ===
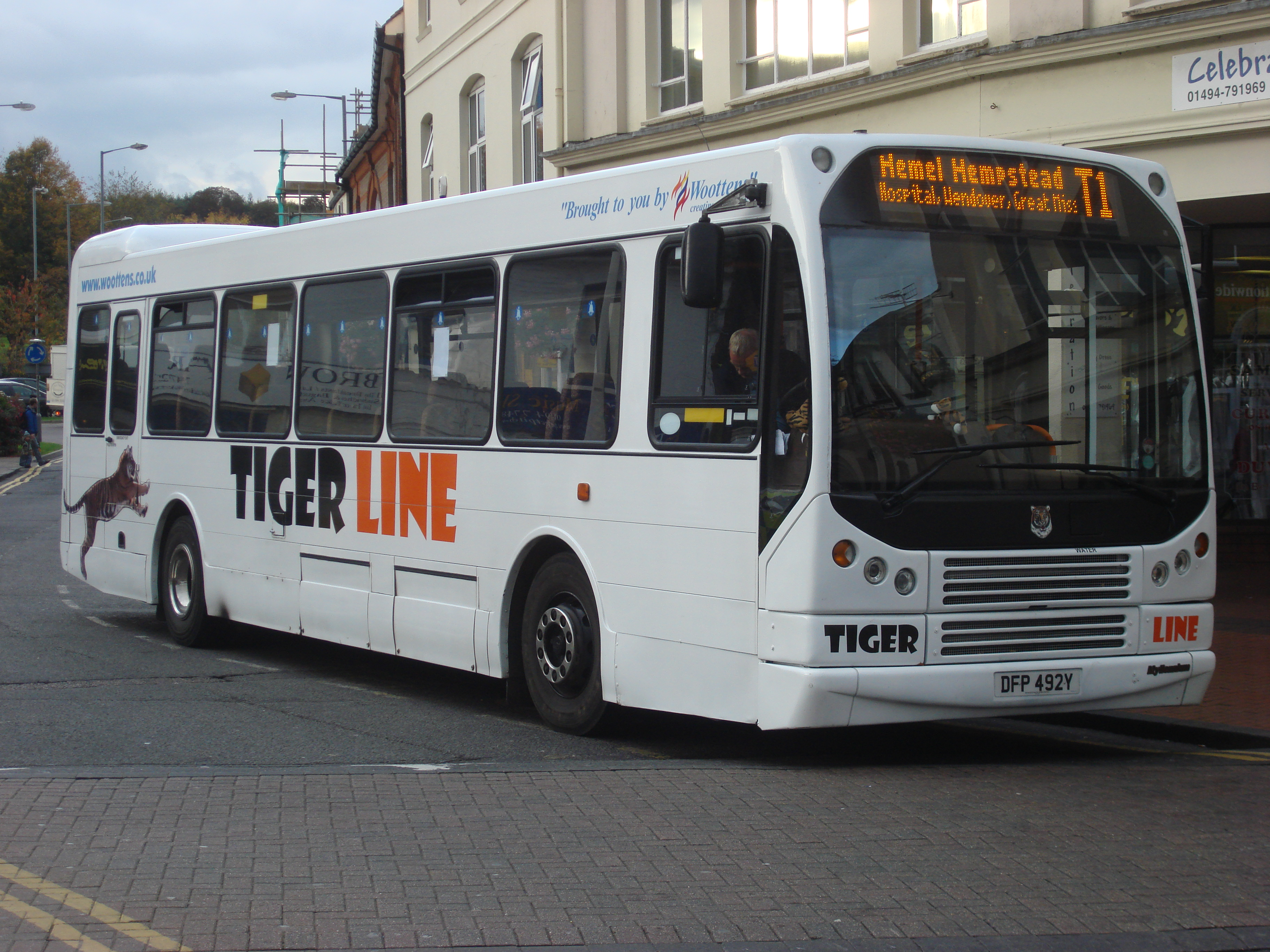
Tiger Line bus

In July 2008 a new commercial bus route between Aylesbury and Hemel Hempstead was launched by Woottens. The name Tiger Line was chosen for this service as the route, numbered T1, was operated with Leyland Tiger single-deck buses. It initially operated hourly, with a two-hourly Saturday service operating as far as Bovingdon. The route provided new links from Chesham and Great Missenden to Stoke Mandeville Hospital and received praise from Buckinghamshire County Council's cabinet member for transport, Valerie Letheren. The route also serves the Roald Dahl Museum and Story Centre. An extra early morning and late evening service was added from January 2009.

In April 2009 the county council contract for routes 106 and 321 (High Wycombe - Princes Risborough) was won under the Tiger Line name, and was later supplemented by a commercial service, T3, operating over a similar route. These routes used Leyland Olympians and were the first regular routes to use double-deckers. In August 2009 a new route T2 was introduced between Watford and Hemel Hempstead, with one journey in each direction extending to Chesham in an attempt to win commuter traffic. This service operated in direct competition with an existing service operated by Arriva the Shires. The T1 was reduced in frequency at the same time. The T2 was improved to operate half hourly from January 2010.

Further changes came in May 2010, with the T1 cut back to terminate at Whelpley Hill and no longer serve Bovingdon and Hemel Hempstead. Two weeks later the T2 was improved once again to include an extra peak journey to Chesham.

In September 2009 a promotion was run with local radio station Mix 96 to name the Tiger Line mascot; the winning entry was read out on Mix's breakfast show. The name chosen was Roary the Tiger. New route T5, linking Amersham and Chesham to St Albans and Hatfield, was introduced in August 2010, but withdrawn in May 2011. The company's remaining services, including its school bus routes, were withdrawn in December 2011.
