= World's End, Buckinghamshire =

Hamlet in Buckinghamshire, England

Coordinates: 51.775°N 0.7557°W

World's End
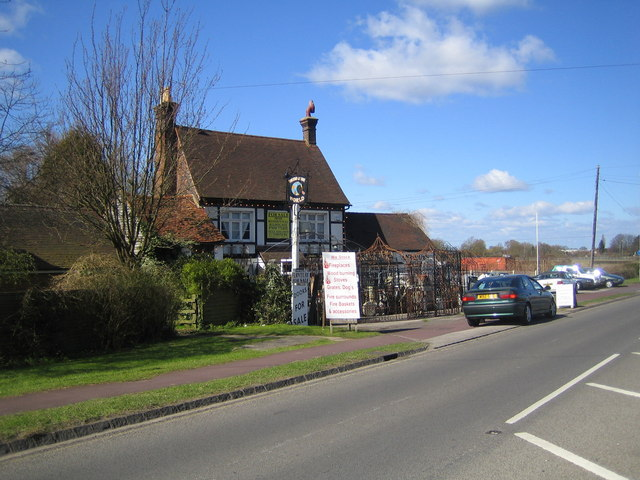
- Former public house "The End of the World"

- Location within Buckinghamshire
- OS grid reference: SP858092
- Unitary authority: Buckinghamshire
- Ceremonial county: Buckinghamshire
- Region: South East
- Country: England
- Sovereign state: United Kingdom
- Post town: AYLESBURY
- Postcode district: HP22
- Dialling code: 01296
- Police: Thames Valley
- Fire: Buckinghamshire
- Ambulance: South Central
- UK Parliament: Aylesbury

World's End is a hamlet 0.5 miles (0.80 km) north of Wendover, Buckinghamshire. It is part of the civil parish of Wendover and is within the Buckinghamshire unitary authority area. Today the settlement straddles the B4009. Prior to the construction of the Wendover Bypass World's End was on the A413.

The hamlet's name is commonly associated with dwellings or places in remote locations, on the outskirts, or just beyond the limit of a town. Until recently there were two pubs in World's End. The first was called 'The End of the World' which closed in 2006 and in the 19th century was known as 'The Swan Inn'. The second pub was 'The Marquis of Granby' which can be traced back until the 16th century, and has now been renovated and renamed 'The Village Gate'.

A large garden centre is located at the north end of the settlement. Along World's End Way, is the old Weston Turville Reservoir. It was constructed to provide water for the Wendover Arm of the Grand Union Canal. It is now a nature reserve and Site of Special Scientific Interest managed by the Berkshire, Buckinghamshire and Oxfordshire Wildlife Trust.
