= Wrelton =

Village and civil parish in North Yorkshire, England

Coordinates: 54.263°N 0.828°W

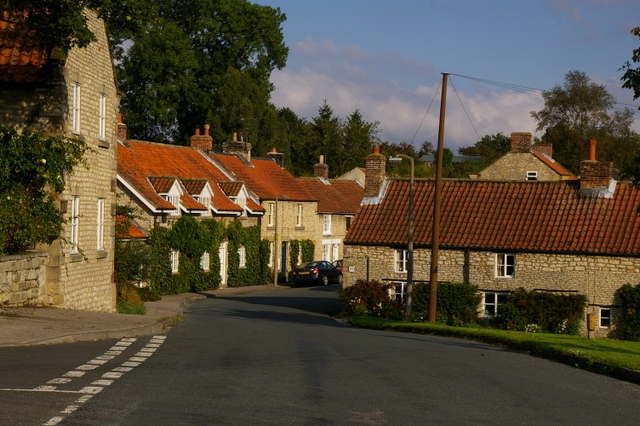
- The east end of Wrelton village

- Location within North Yorkshire
- Population: 332 (2011 census)
- OS grid reference: SE764859
- Unitary authority: North Yorkshire
- Ceremonial county: North Yorkshire
- Region: Yorkshire and the Humber
- Country: England
- Sovereign state: United Kingdom
- Post town: PICKERING
- Postcode district: YO18
- Police: North Yorkshire
- Fire: North Yorkshire
- Ambulance: Yorkshire
- UK Parliament: Thirsk and Malton

Wrelton is a village and civil parish in North Yorkshire, England. It is on the A170 road and 2 miles west of Pickering.

== History ==
Wrelton is mentioned in the Domesday Book as having seven villagers, one ploughland, and a meadow covering 4 acres (1.6 ha). The name of the village is thought to derive from the Old English wearg-hyll (felon hill). The suggestion of the full name would translate as farm by or on the gallows-hill.

Wrelton's nearest town is Pickering, and is 30 minutes away from Scarborough. Its nearest city is York, which is 45 minutes away. Wrelton is home to holiday cottages, bed and breakfasts, a local pub and holiday home park, chapel and village hall. Villages surrounding and near Wrelton include, Cropton, Middleton, Rosedale and Aislaby.

In 1992, a bypass for the A170 road was built to the south of the village. The £730,000 road was opened on 15 April 1992. The number 128 bus between Helmsley and Scarborough, calls at the village six times a day in each direction. Journey times to Scarborough are just over an hour.

Wrelton was part of the Ryedale district between 1974 and 2023. It is now administered by North Yorkshire Council.

== Population ==
The table below lists the population of the village of Wrelton only;

Population of Wrelton village
1881	1891	1901	1911	1921	1931	1941	1951	1961	2011	2015
229	212	182	202	223	203	No census	221	192	230 (a)	250 (a)

a = estimated

In 2001 and 2011, the census has included the entire civil parish, which also includes the village of Aislaby to the west. In 2001, the population was recorded as being 331, and in 2011 as 332. In 2015, North Yorkshire County Council estimated the population of Wrelton to be 230 in 2011, and 250 in 2015. Aislaby was deemed to have had a static population of 100 in 2011 and 2015.

== See also ==
- Listed buildings in Wrelton
