= Woollaston =

Hamlet in Staffordshire, England

Coordinates: 52.73°N 02.20°W

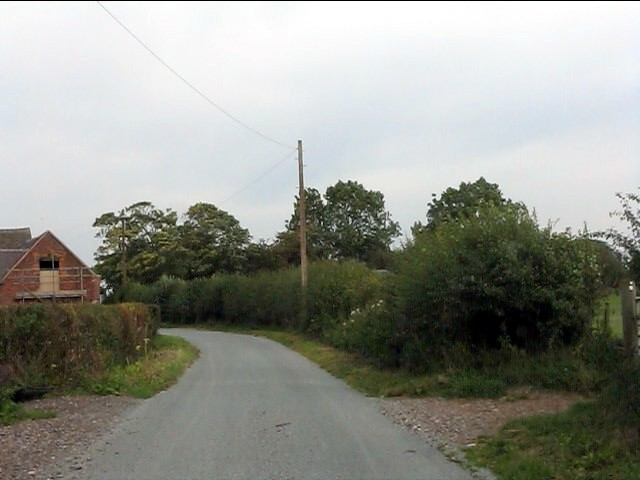
- By Woollaston Farm

- Location within Staffordshire
- OS grid reference: SJ8615
- Shire county: Staffordshire
- Region: West Midlands
- Country: England
- Sovereign state: United Kingdom
- Post town: Stafford
- Postcode district: ST20
- Police: Staffordshire
- Fire: Staffordshire
- Ambulance: West Midlands

Woollaston is a small hamlet near Bradley, Staffordshire, England, four miles northwest of Penkridge and two miles southeast of Church Eaton. It lies in quite flat dairy farming countryside a mile south of Shredicote and a mile west of Mitton. All three villages consist of only a couple of farms and a few cottages scattered along the Church Eaton Road, which runs from Mitton to Church Eaton parallel to Church Eaton Brook, which runs southeastwards towards Penkridge, being a tributary of the River Penk.
