= Wollaston Theatre =

- U.S. National Register of Historic Places
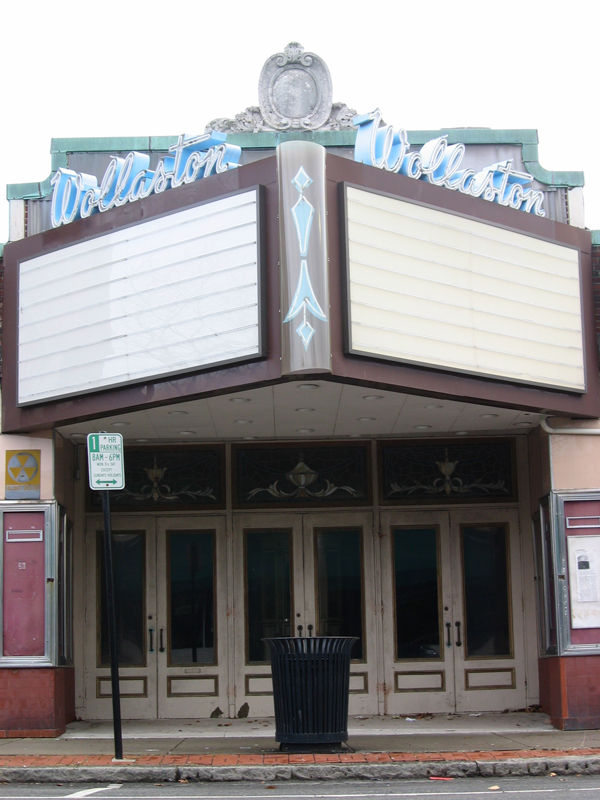

- Location within Massachusetts Location within the United States
- Location: 14 Beale St., Quincy, Massachusetts
- Coordinates: 42°16′03″N 71°1′0″W
- Built: 1926
- Architect: E.H. McEwan
- Architectural style: Classical Revival
- Demolished: 2016
- MPS: Quincy MRA
- NRHP reference No.: 89001315
- Added to NRHP: September 20, 1989

The Wollaston Theatre was a historic theater at 14 Beale Street in Quincy, Massachusetts, United States.

It was built in 1926 and added to the National Register of Historic Places in 1989. In recent decades, the "Wolly" was a second-run discount movie house run by Arthur and Yvonne Chandler.

The theater closed in 2003. After many plans to purchase and renovate it, following Arthur Chandler's death, the theater was finally sold to Miao Kun “Michael” Fang, the owner of the C-Mart supermarket chain.

Demolition of the theatre began in June, 2016, and was completed over the next few months. The site is now a parking lot.

The Wollaston Theatre was the venue for the last performance of the Plasmatics and Wendy O. Williams on their final tour in 1988.

== See also ==
- National Register of Historic Places listings in Quincy, Massachusetts
