= St John of Beverley's Church =

St John of Beverley's Church is the name of:

- St John of Beverley Church, Beverley in the East Riding of Yorkshire, England
- St John of Beverley's Church, Harpham in the East Riding of Yorkshire, England
- St John of Beverley's Church, Salton in North Yorkshire, England
