= Joseph Micklethwaite, 1st Viscount Micklethwaite =

Joseph Micklethwaite, 1st Viscount Micklethwaite (c. 1680 – 16 January 1734) was an English politician, peer and diplomat.

== Early life and family background ==
Joseph Micklethwaite was born circa 1680. The Micklethwaites were the descendants of Dr. Joseph Micklethwaite of York, who had retired from his physician's practice and had purchased the manor of Swine, becoming a gentleman farmer and an active county magistrate. Dr. Micklethwaite was married to Ann Topham, the widow of Christopher Topham, member of Parliament and York merchant, and the daughter of Percival Levett, a Sheriff of York and a merchant. Joseph's elder brother was Thomas Micklethwaite of Swine, Yorkshire, who represented Arundel in Parliament, was later a Lord of the Treasury, and subsequently was named Lieutenant-General of the Ordnance.

== Career ==
Joseph Micklethwaite began his career working in the Netherlands for Lord Shaftesbury and then in Spain as secretary to Earl Stanhope, the English ambassador to Spain. On Stanhope's return to England, Micklethwaite became his business manager and, while Stanhope was Chancellor of the Exchequer in 1717–18, his secretary. He succeeded in 1718 to his brother's fortune and parliamentary seat (until 1727) at Arundel.

On 14 August 1724, he was created Baron Micklethwaite, of Portarlington, in the Peerage of Ireland. On 6 June 1727, he was further created Viscount Micklethwaite, of Longford, in the same peerage. Lord Micklethwaite represented the town of Kingston upon Hull, in his native Yorkshire from 1727 to 1734.

He was elected as a Bailiff to the board of the Bedford Level Corporation for 1728–29.

== Personal life and death ==
Lord Micklethwaite died unmarried in 1734 and his titles became extinct. He left his estate to his mistress, Anne Ewer, the sister of Jane Ewer, wife of the 3rd Earl of Shaftesbury, from whom it found its way into the Shaftesbury family.

Parliament of Great Britain
Preceded by Henry Lumley; Thomas Micklethwaite	Member of Parliament for Arundel; 1718–1727; With: Henry Lumley 1718–1722; Thomas Lumley 1722–1727	Succeeded by Sir John Shelley, Bt; The Viscount Gage
Preceded by Nathaniel Rogers; George Crowle	Member of Parliament for Kingston upon Hull; 1727–1734; With: George Crowle	Succeeded by George Crowle; Henry Maister
Peerage of Ireland
New creation	Viscount Micklethwaite; 1727–1734	Extinct
New creation	Baron Micklethwaite; 1724–1734	Extinct
