= Sir William St Quintin, 4th Baronet =

English landowner and member of parliament

Sir William St Quintin, 4th Baronet (c. 1700 – 9 May 1770), of Harpham and Scampston in Yorkshire, was an English landowner and member of parliament.

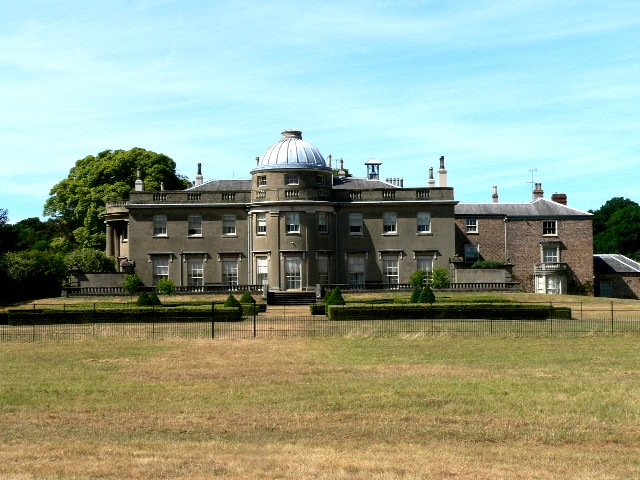
Scampston Hall, North Yorkshire, in 2006

He was the eldest son of Hugh St Quintin (b. 1671). He was educated at Newcome's School in Hackney. He succeeded to the family baronetcy and the Scampston estate near Malton on 30 June 1723 on the death of his uncle, Sir William St Quintin, 3rd Baronet, who had never married.

St Quintin entered Parliament in 1722 as a member for Thirsk, and remained its MP for five years. In 1729–30 he served as High Sheriff of Yorkshire.

He married Rebecca, daughter of Sir John Thompson, Lord Mayor of London, and their children included:

- William St Quintin (1729–1795) who succeeded to the baronetcy
- Mary (d. 1772), who married Vice-Admiral George Darby of Newtown
- Katherine, who married Christopher Griffith, MP, of Padworth
- John Chitty (1730–1746)
- Hugh St Quintin (1731–1736)
- Rebecca St Quintin (d. 1758)

Parliament of Great Britain
Preceded by Thomas Frankland; Thomas Pitt	Member of Parliament for Thirsk; 1722–1727; With: Sir Thomas Frankland	Succeeded by Sir Thomas Frankland; Thomas Robinson
Baronetage of England
Preceded by William St Quintin	Baronet (of Harpham); 1723–1770	Succeeded by William St Quintin
Honorary titles
Preceded by William Harvey	High Sheriff of Yorkshire; 1729–30	Succeeded by Beilby Thompson
