= Lowthorpe =

Village in the East Riding of Yorkshire, England

Coordinates: 54°01′43″N 0°20′52″W

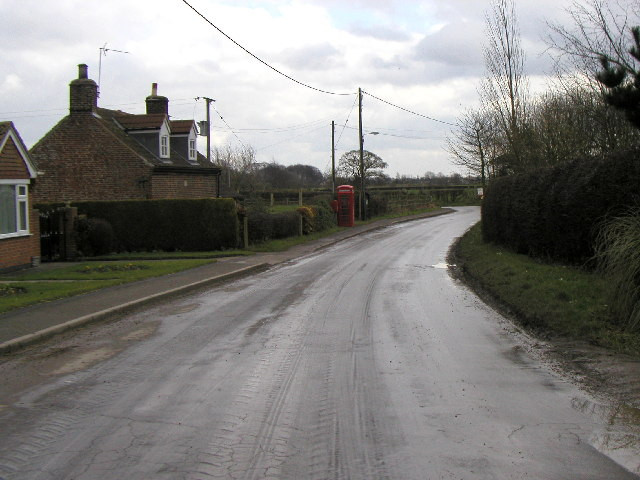
- Lowthorpe village

- Location within the East Riding of Yorkshire
- OS grid reference: TA083603
  - London: 175 mi (282 km) S
- Civil parish: Harpham
- Unitary authority: East Riding of Yorkshire
- Ceremonial county: East Riding of Yorkshire
- Region: Yorkshire and the Humber
- Country: England
- Sovereign state: United Kingdom
- Post town: DRIFFIELD
- Postcode district: YO25
- Dialling code: 01377
- Police: Humberside
- Fire: Humberside
- Ambulance: Yorkshire
- UK Parliament: Bridlington and The Wolds

Lowthorpe is a village and former civil parish, now in the parish of Harpham, in the East Riding of Yorkshire, England. It is situated approximately 3 miles (5 km) north-east of Driffield town centre and 7 miles (11 km) south-west of Bridlington town centre. In 1931 the parish had a population of 159. On 1 April 1935 the parish was abolished and merged with Harpham.

It lies south-east of the A614 road and just north-west of the Yorkshire Coast railway line from Hull to Scarborough. Lowthorpe railway station served the village until it closed on 5 January 1970.

The name Lowthorpe derives from the Old Norse Lagiþorp or Logiþorp meaning 'Lagi's' or 'Logi's secondary settlement'.

St Martin's Church, Lowthorpe was designated a Grade II* listed building in 1966 and is now recorded in the National Heritage List for England, maintained by Historic England.

In 1823 Lowthorpe (then spelt 'Lowthorp'), was in the Wapentake of Dickering. The church and perpetual curacy was under the patronage of the St Quintin family. Population at the time was 149, with occupations including nine farmers, a linen manufacturer, a corn miller, and a rope maker. Residents included William Thomas St Quintin Esquire, of Lowthorp Hall, and a gentleman.

== See also ==
- Listed buildings in Harpham
