= Nathaniel Rogers (MP) =

Nathaniel Rogers (died March 1737), of Kingston upon Hull, was a British merchant and politician who sat in the House of Commons from 1717 to 1727.

Rogers was the son of John Rogers, merchant of Kingston upon Hull, and his wife Elizabeth Nelthorpe, daughter of Edward Nelthorpe of Barton-upon-Humber, Lincolnshire, who had married in 1665. His grandfather, John Rogers, was an alderman, and was mayor of Hull in 1652; his father was mayor in 1673, and died in 1680. Nathaniel in turn became an alderman of Hull.

Rogers was returned as Member of Parliament for Kingston upon Hull, at a by-election on 13 March 1717 in succession to his brother-in-law, William Maister. He voted against the Government on Cadogan on 4 June 1717 and on the Peerage Bill in 1719, and with them on the repeal of the Occasional Conformity and Schism Acts. He was re-elected at the 1722 general election, but did not stand in 1727.

Rogers died in late March 1737, and was buried in the South Choir Aisle of Holy Trinity Church (now Hull Minster) on 31 March: his tomb slab, shared with his brother John (d. 1728), much worn, can still be seen.

Parliament of Great Britain
Preceded by Sir William St Quintin; William Maister	Member of Parliament for Kingston upon Hull; 1717–1727; With: Sir William St Quintin 1715–1724; George Crowle 1724–1727	Succeeded by George Crowle; Joseph Micklethwaite
