= All Saints' Church, Muston =

Church in Muston, North Yorkshire, England

Coordinates: 54°12′05″N 0°19′08″W

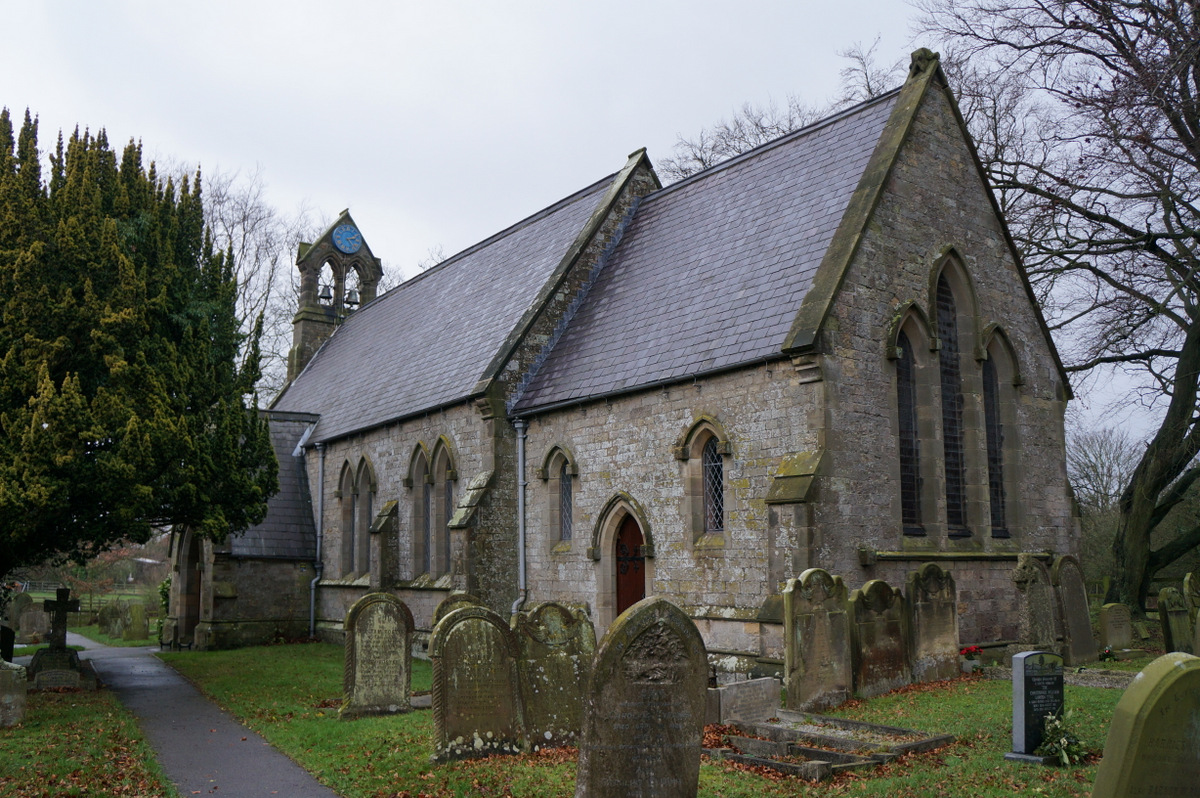
The church, in 2014

All Saints' Church is the parish church of Muston, North Yorkshire, a village in England.

In the early Mediaeval period, Muston was in the parish of All Saints' Church, Hunmanby, although it had a chapel of ease by 1115, and had its own vicar from 1269. In 1856, it was described as a "a small and mean, ancient, edifice", with a nave, chancel and south porch and a turret; the floor was paved with pebbles. In 1863, the church was demolished and a replacement constructed on the same site, to a design by William Baldwin Stewart. The building was grade II listed in 1966.

The church is built of limestone on a moulded chamfered plinth and has a slate roof. It consists of a nave, north and south aisles, a south porch, a chancel and a vestry. On the west gable is a gabled bellcote with two pointed arches on colonnettes, and a clock face on the east side. Inside the porch are two re-set medieval carved heads. Inside, the altar table has an early stone base, there is a possible holy water stoup, a Norman font, and a piscina in the form of a pillar.

== See also ==
- Listed buildings in Muston, North Yorkshire
