= Eastland Company =

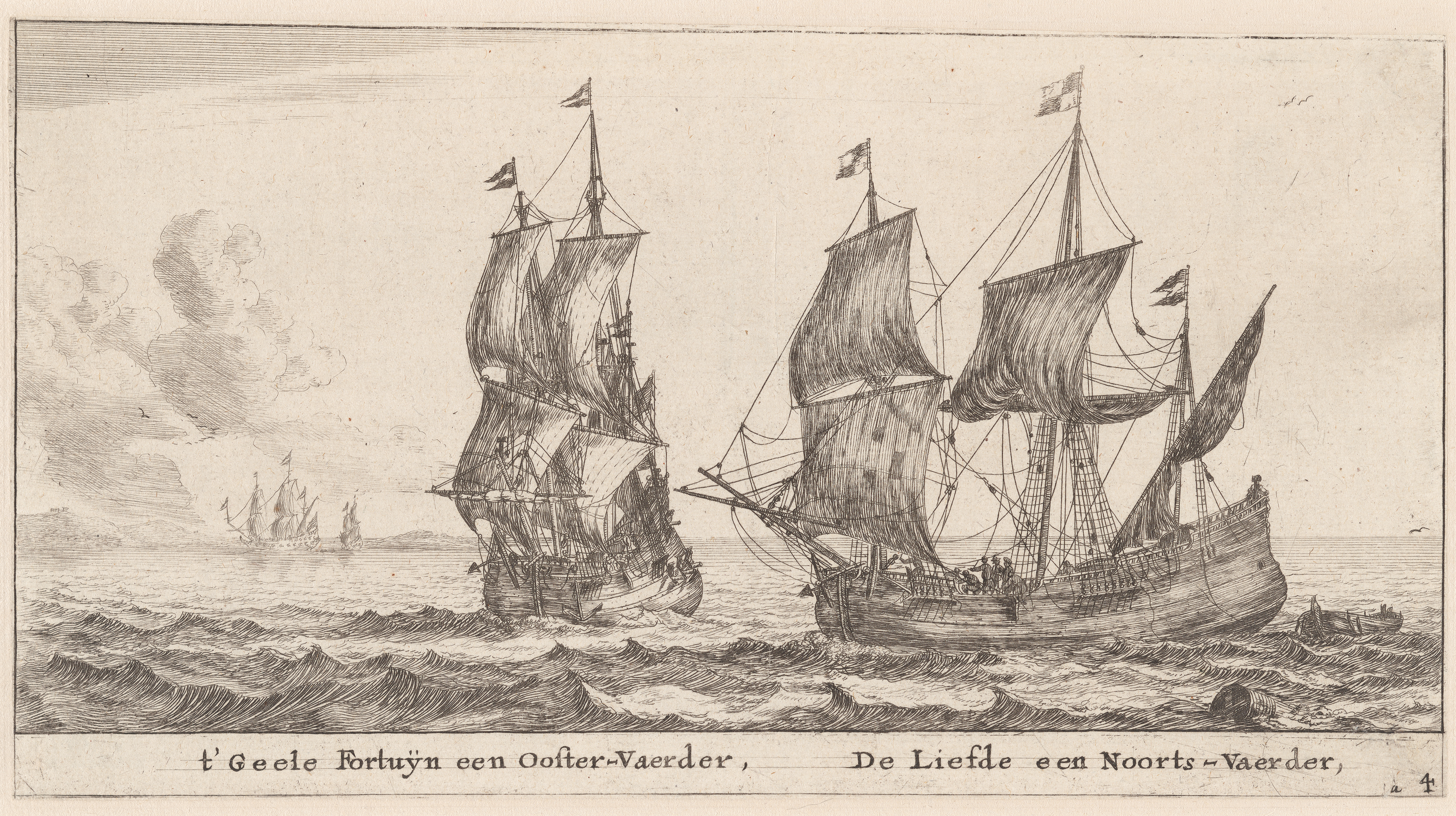
Ships trading in the Baltic Sea, territory of the Eastland Company

The Eastland Company, or North Sea Company, was an English Crown-chartered company, founded in 1579 to foster trade with Scandinavia and Baltic Sea states. Like the better-known Russia Company, this was an attempt by the English to challenge the Hanseatic League's dominance in the commerce of Northern and Central Europe.

== History ==
=== Charter ===
Its charter was dated in 1579. By the first article, the company was erected into a body politic, under the title of the Company of Merchants of the East; to consist of Englishmen, all practicing merchants, who have trafficked through the sound, before the year 1568, into Norway, Sweden, Poland, Livonia, Prussia, Pomerania, etc., and likewise Revel, Königsberg, Danzig, Copenhagen, etc., excepting Narva, Muscovy, and its dependencies. Most of the following articles granted them the usual prerogatives of such companies, including a seal, governor, courts, laws, etc.

The company's charter was confirmed by Charles II in 1661, with this addition; that no person of what quality soever, living in London, should be admitted a member unless he were free of the city. Many members of the Eastland Company were prominent English merchants in York, among them Thomas Herbert, Charles Micklethwaite, Christopher Topham, Matthew Topham and Percival Levett.

=== Specific privileges ===
The privileges specific to this company, compared to other English companies of the time, were:

- That none shall be admitted a member, who is already a member of another company, nor any retail dealer at all.
- That no qualified merchant be admitted without paying 6 pounds 13 shillings 6 pence.
- That a member of another company, desiring to renounce the privileges thereof, and to be received into that of the East, shall be admitted gratis, provided that he procures the same favor for a merchant of the East, willing to fill his place.
- That the Merchant Adventurers who never dealt in the East, in the places expressed in the charter, may be received as members of the company on paying 40 marks. That notwithstanding this union of the Adventurers of England with the Company of the East, each shall retain its rights and privileges.
- That they shall export no cloths but what are dyed and pressed; except 100 pieces every year, which are allowed them gratis.

=== Trade Act 1672 ===
The company performed poorly however, and resulted in most of the Baltic trade being in the hands of Dutch competitors. In 1672 Parliament passed the Trade Act 1672 (25 Cha.II c.7), entitled An Act for the incouragement of the Greeneland and Eastland Trades, and for the better secureing [sic] the Plantation Trade. The act was a mortal blow to the Eastland company. Under sections 8 and 9 of the act and notwithstanding the company's charter, Parliament opened up free trade to Sweden, Denmark, and Norway, and allowed any Englishman to be admitted into the Eastland Company on paying only 40 shillings.

== Crest ==
The company's crest featured a creature called an allocamelus, a mythical beast which members of the company reported seeing, though Parker's Heraldry notes that it was only members of this company which reported sightings of it.
