= Sir William St Quintin, 3rd Baronet =

English official and Member of Parliament

Sir William St Quintin, 3rd Baronet (c. 1662 – 30 June 1723), of Harpham in Yorkshire, was an English merchant and Whig politician who sat in the House of Commons from 1695 to 1723. He held a succession of public offices.

== Biography ==
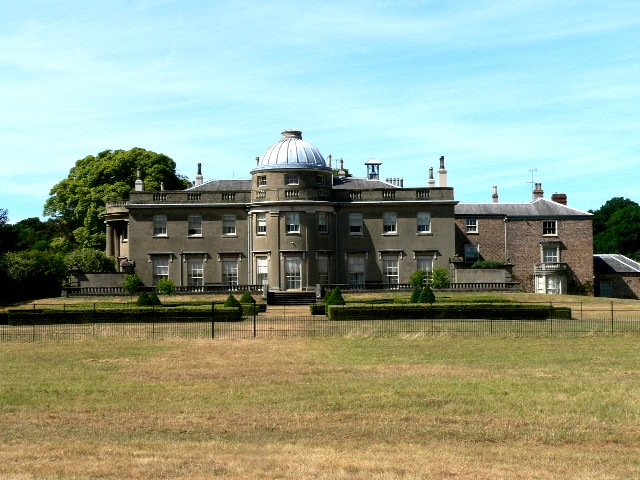
Scampston Hall, North Yorkshire, in 2006

St Quintin was the eldest son of William St Quintin of Muston and his wife Elizabeth Strickland, daughter of Sir William Strickland of Boynton. His father died in 1695 and he succeeded to the baronetcy in November 1695 on the death of his grandfather, Sir Henry St. Quintin of Harpham, who outlived his father by only a few days. In the 1690s, St. Quintin bought an estate at Scampston near Malton and Scampston Hall subsequently became the main family seat.

St Quintin belonged to one of the leading merchant families in Hull, and was an active member of the corporation. He was Chamberlain of Hull in 1689. He entered Parliament at the 1695 English general election as Member of Parliament for Kingston upon Hull, and served as the city's MP in eleven parliaments. A capable official, he held a series of responsible and lucrative posts. From 1698 to 1701 was a Commissioner of Customs, with the substantial salary of £1000 a year, but resigned the office when a new law barring the commissioners from sitting in Parliament came into force. He was Mayor of Hull in 1700. From 1706 to 1713 he was a Commissioner of Revenue in Ireland, at the same salary. He was Commissioner for taking subscriptions to South Sea Company in 1711. From 1714 to 1717 he was a Lord of the Treasury.

St Quintin was Mayor of Hull again in 1715. In 1717, he became Commissioner of the Alienation Office, and in 1720 he was appointed joint Vice-Treasurer, Receiver General and Paymaster of Ireland, offices he held until his death. He was also a member of the Privy Council of Ireland.

St Quintin died unmarried on 30 June 1723, and was succeeded in the baronetcy by his nephew William. His body was interred at St. John of Beverley Church Harpham.

Parliament of England
Preceded by John Ramsden; Charles Osborne	Member of Parliament for Kingston upon Hull; 1695–1707; With: Charles Osborne 1695–1701; William Maister 1701–1707	Succeeded by Parliament of Great Britain
Parliament of Great Britain
Preceded by Parliament of England	Member of Parliament for Kingston upon Hull; 1707–1723; With: William Maister 1707–1717; Nathaniel Rogers 1717–1723	Succeeded by George Crowle; Nathaniel Rogers
Baronetage of England
Preceded by Henry St Quintin	Baronet (of Harpham); 1695–1723	Succeeded by William St Quintin
