= St Nicholas' Church, Ruston Parva =

Church in Ruston Parva, East Riding of Yorkshire, England

Coordinates: 54°02′22″N 0°22′33″W

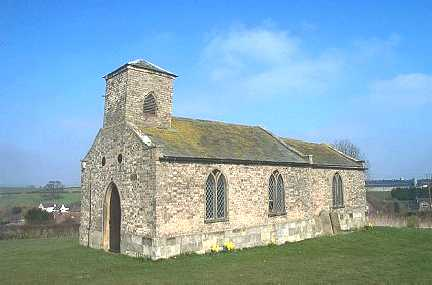
The church, in 2002

St Nicholas' Church is an Anglican church in Ruston Parva, a hamlet in the East Riding of Yorkshire, in England.

A chapel of ease was built in Ruston Parva by 1312, in the parish of St Martin's Church, Lowthorpe. In 1832, it was demolished and a new church constructed by a local builder, reusing some of the old stone as a plinth. The building was grade II* listed in 1966.

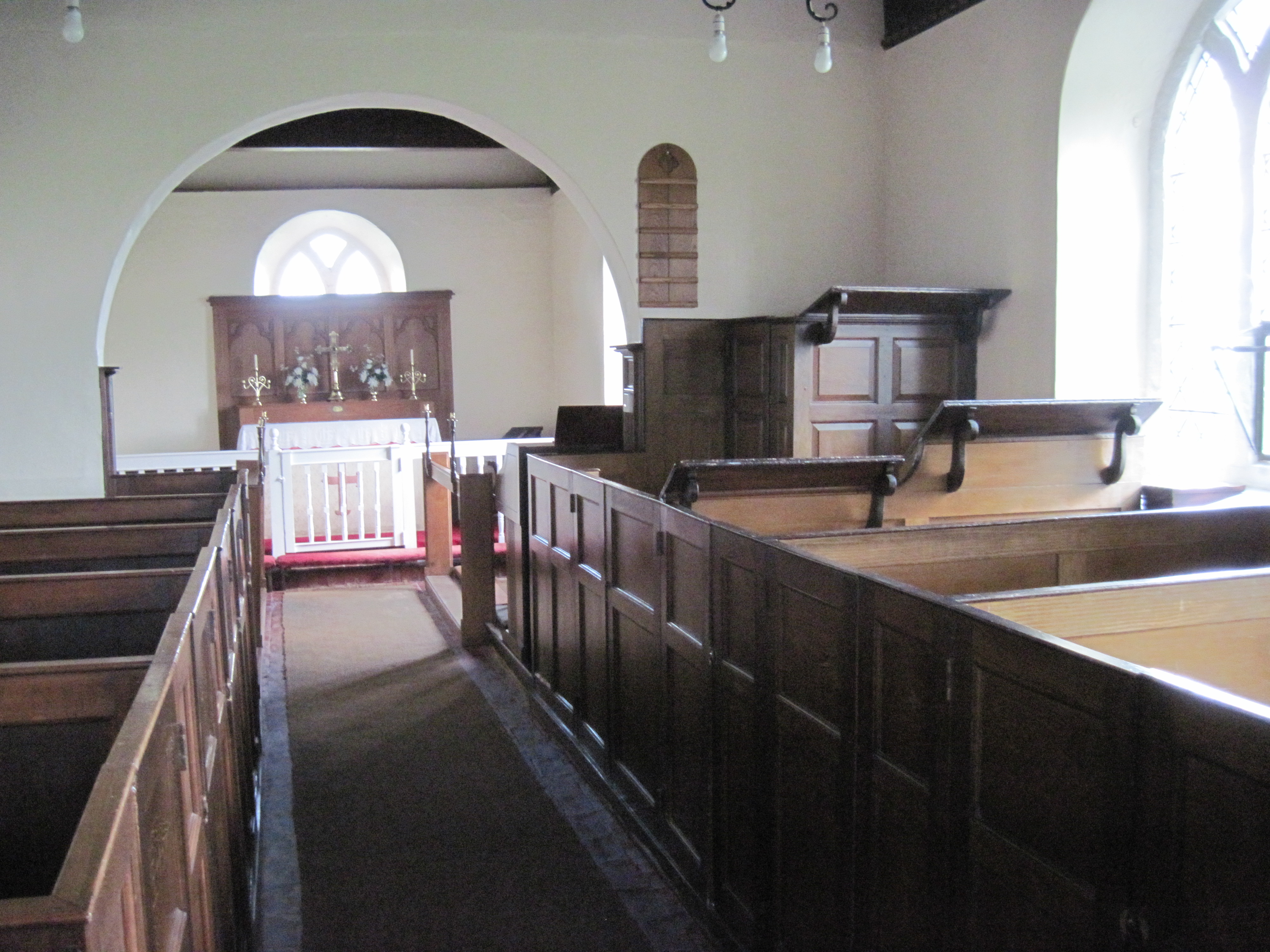
The interior, looking east

The church is built of yellow brick on a stone plinth, with a slate roof. It consists of a nave with a bellcote, and a chancel. The windows are pointed and have Y-tracery, and the bellcote has pointed openings with louvres and a pyramidal roof. Inside, there are box pews, a double-decker pulpit, and a 12th-century tub font.

== See also ==
- Grade II* listed buildings in the East Riding of Yorkshire
- Listed buildings in Harpham
