= Lowthorpe railway station =

Disused railway station in the East Riding of Yorkshire, England

Lowthorpe
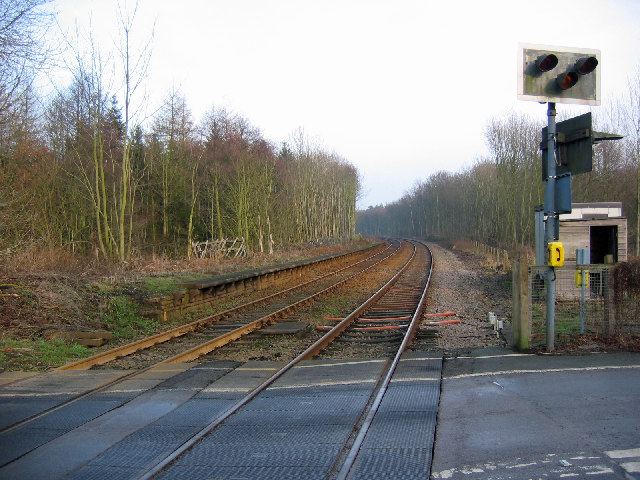
- Platform remains of Lowthorpe railway station in 2006

General information
- Location: Lowthorpe, East Riding of Yorkshire; England
- Coordinates: 54.0256°N 0.3350°W
- Grid reference: TA090601
- Platforms: 2

Other information
- Status: Disused

History
- Original company: York and North Midland Railway
- Pre-grouping: North Eastern Railway
- Post-grouping: London and North Eastern Railway

Key dates
- 6 October 1846: opened
- 5 January 1970: closed
Location

Lowthorpe railway station was a minor railway station serving the village of Lowthorpe on the Yorkshire Coast Line from Scarborough to Hull and was opened on 6 October 1846 by the York and North Midland Railway. It closed on 5 January 1970.

Preceding station	Historical railways	Following station
Nafferton	Y&NMR; Hull and Scarborough Line	Burton Agnes; Station closed; Line open
