= Thomas Micklethwaite =

British Member of Parliament (1678–1718)

The Right Honourable Thomas Micklethwaite

Member of Parliament for Arundel
- In office 1715–1718

Treasurer to the Commissioners of Transport
- In office 1708–1715

Lords Commissioner of the Treasury
- In office 1717–1718

Personal details
- Born: 1678 Swine, East Riding of Yorkshire
- Died: 28 March 1718 (aged 39–40)
- Resting place: St Andrew Holborn, London
- Party: Whigs (British political party)
- Parents: Joseph Micklethwaite (father); Constance Micklethwaite (nee Middleton) (mother)
- Relatives: Joseph Micklethwaite, 1st Viscount Micklethwaite (brother)
- Education: Jesus College, Cambridge

Thomas Micklethwaite (1678 – 28 March 1718) was a British MP who served as the Lord Commissioner of the Treasury from 1717 to 1718.

== Biography ==
Micklethwaite was born in 1678 and was baptised on 19 July at Holy Trinity Church, Micklegate, he was the first son of Joseph Micklethwaite and Constance Middleton, and the brother of Joseph Micklethwaite, 1st Viscount Micklethwaite. He studied at, but did not graduate from, Jesus College, Cambridge. In 1708, he was appointed Treasurer to the Commissioners of Transport. In 1717 he was made Lord Commissioner of the Treasury after his predecessor Stanhope became first lord and Chancellor of the Exchequer. In 1718, he was appointed Lieutenant-General of the Ordnance. He died on 28 March 1718.

Preceded by Viscount Lumley; The Earl of Thomond	Member of Parliament for Arundel; 1715–1718; With: Henry Lumley	Succeeded by Joseph Micklethwaite
