= Nafferton railway station =

Railway station in the East Riding of Yorkshire, England

Nafferton
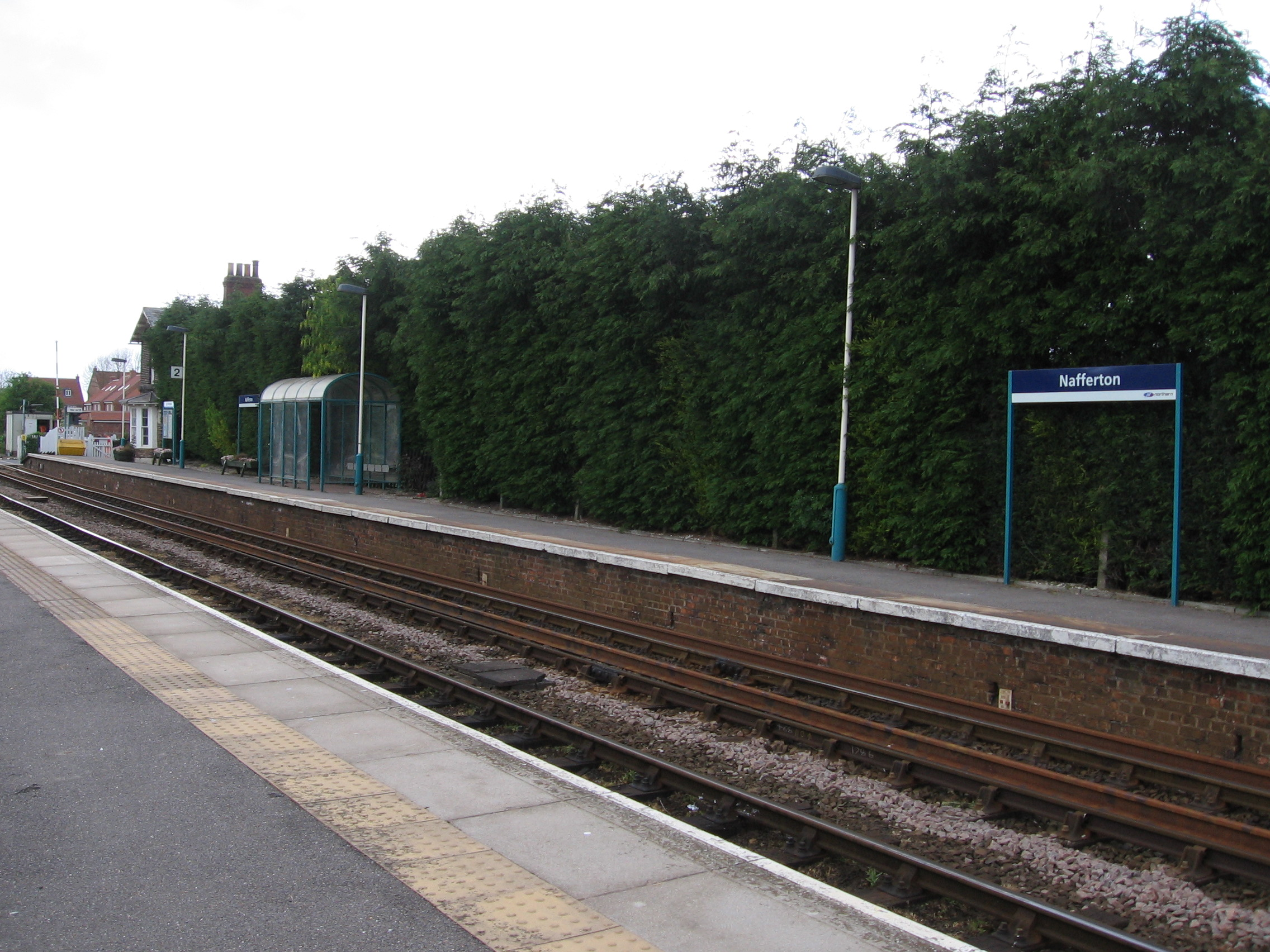

General information
- Location: Nafferton, East Riding of Yorkshire; England
- Coordinates: 54.01120°N 0.38400°W
- Grid reference: TA058584
- Manager: Northern
- Platforms: 2

Other information
- Station code: NFN
- Classification: DfT category F2

Passengers
- 2021/22: ▲27,220
- 2022/23: ▲31,970
- 2023/24: ▲33,490
- 2024/25: ▲40,808
- 2025/26: ▲47,210
Location
Notes
- Passenger statistics from the Office of Rail and Road

Nafferton railway station serves the village of Nafferton in the East Riding of Yorkshire, England. It is located on the Yorkshire Coast Line and is operated by Northern that provides all passenger train services. In 1985, the station and the adjoining station master's house were given Grade II listed building status.

== Facilities ==
It is unstaffed and has no ticket machine, so tickets must be bought in advance or on the train. There are waiting shelters and timetable information posters on each platform. Step-free access is available to both, via the automatic level crossing if travelling south.

== Services ==
The station has a similar service level to that at neighbouring Hutton Cranswick: hourly trains on weekdays to Hull and Bridlington, with additional calls at peak periods. Most southbound trains run through to Selby and York, though two morning trains run to Sheffield. On Sundays, there is an hourly service in each direction to Sheffield and Scarborough since the summer 2019 timetable change.

== See also ==
- Listed buildings in Nafferton

| Preceding station | National Rail | Following station |
|---|---|---|
| Driffield | Northern Yorkshire Coast Line | Bridlington |
Historical railways
| Driffield | Y&NMR Hull and Scarborough Line | Lowthorpe Station closed; Line open |
