= Henry Maister =

Henry Maister (1699–1744), of Hull and Winestead, Yorkshire, was a British merchant and Whig politician who sat in the House of Commons from 1734 to 1741.

Maister was baptized on 1 February 1699, the eldest son of William Maister, a merchant of Hull. In 1716, he succeeded his father, and ran the family mercantile business with his brother Nathaniel. He married Mary Tymperon, daughter of Rev. Henry Tymperon of Carnaby, Yorkshire on 25 August 1724. She died in of smallpox in 1725. He married as his second wife Mary Cayley, daughter of Sir Arthur Cayley, 3rd Baronet, of Brompton, Yorkshire on 19 January 1727

Maister was Sheriff of Kingston upon Hull in 1729. He was returned unopposed as Member of Parliament for Kingston upon Hull at a by-election on 6 February 1734, and then elected in a contest at the 1734 British general election soon after. He voted regularly with the Government. He did not stand in 1741.

Maister and his wife several children. On 13 April 1743 a fire destroyed the family house in High Street, Hull and his wife Mary and her infant son died, along with two maidservants. The family deeds, plate and portraits were destroyed in the fire. Maister immediately began rebuilding on the same High Street site He died on 15 December 1744.

The house was completed by his brother and is now the property of the National Trust.

Parliament of Great Britain
Preceded by George Crowle; Joseph Micklethwaite	Member of Parliament for Kingston upon Hull; 1734–1741; With: George Crowle	Succeeded by George Crowle; William Carter
