= Salton, North Yorkshire =

Village and civil parish in North Yorkshire, England

Coordinates: 54.21218°N 0.90363°W

Salton
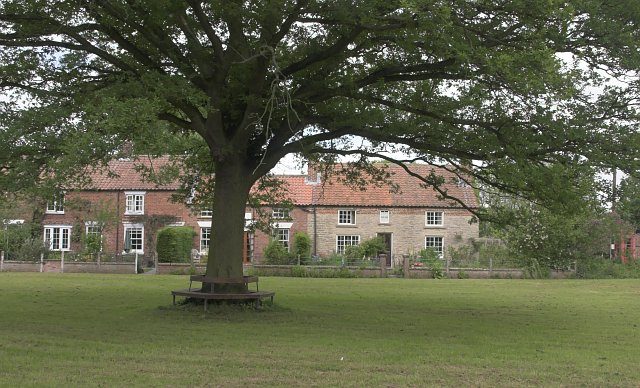
- The village green at Salton

- Location within North Yorkshire
- OS grid reference: SE715801
- Unitary authority: North Yorkshire
- Ceremonial county: North Yorkshire
- Region: Yorkshire and the Humber
- Country: England
- Sovereign state: United Kingdom
- Post town: YORK
- Postcode district: YO62
- Police: North Yorkshire
- Fire: North Yorkshire
- Ambulance: Yorkshire
- UK Parliament: Thirsk and Malton

Salton is a village and civil parish in North Yorkshire, England. The population of the village at the 2011 census was 110, but the details can be found listed in the civil parish of Edstone.

From 1974 to 2023 it was part of the district of Ryedale, it is now administered by the unitary North Yorkshire Council.

== History ==
Salton is mentioned in the Domesday Book as belonging to the then Archbishop of York and having four villagers and five ploughlands. The name of the village derives from the Old English words of Salh, meaning a willow or sallow and tūn, which means an enclosure or farmstead.

During the 12th century, the Norman St John of Beverley's Church, was set alight with the villagers inside by marauding Scots. The church, which had its last major renovation in 1881, was restored again in 2019 with a grant from the Heritage Lottery Funding. The church has been described as being a "near perfect example of Norman architecture", and is now a grade I listed building.

The population of the village in 2011 was 110, but for the purposes of census information, the data was included in the parish of Edstone. North Yorkshire County Council estimated the population of the parish to be 100 people in 2015.

== Geography ==
The village lies 6 miles (9.7 km) south of Kirkbymoorside and 6.5 miles (10.5 km) south west of Pickering. Salton is in the relatively low-lying fertile land of the Vale of Pickering near to the confluence of the rivers Dove and Rye. The highest point in the parish is Cliff Hill, just to the south, which rises 150 feet (46 m) above sea level.

== See also ==
- Listed buildings in Salton, North Yorkshire
