= All Saints' Church, Nafferton =

Church in Nafferton, East Riding of Yorkshire, England

Coordinates: 54°00′58″N 0°23′26″W

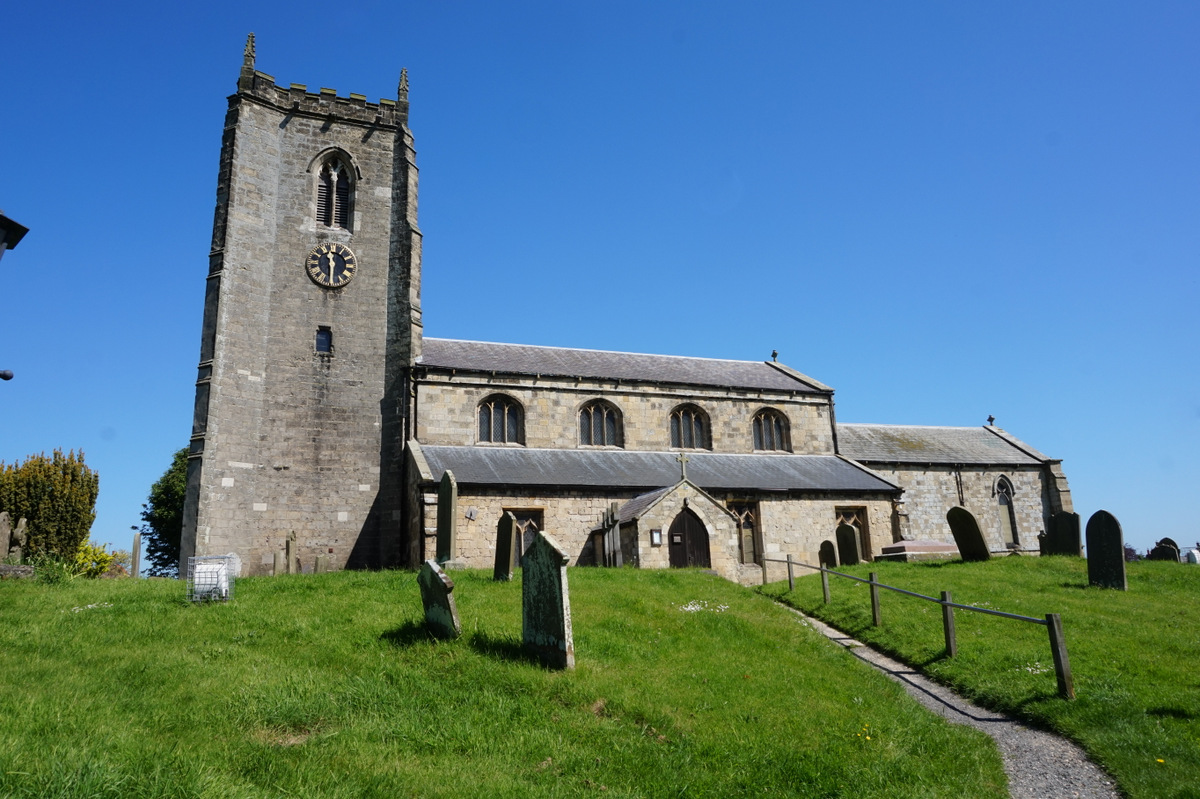
The church, in 2017

All Saints' Church is the parish church of Nafferton, a village in the East Riding of Yorkshire, in England.

The oldest part of the church is the 12th-century nave. The chancel was built in the late 13th century, and aisles were added in the 14th and 15th centuries. The tower was added in the 15th century, and porches were constructed in the 19th century. The church was restored and reordered in 1828, 1846 and 1870, the last work including the construction of a vestry; and again in 1882–1883 by Temple Moore. The building was grade I listed in 1966.

It is built in stone with slate roofs, and consists of a nave with a clerestory, north and south aisles, north and south porches, a chancel and a west tower. The tower has a moulded plinth, diagonal buttresses, a west doorway with a moulded surround, a four-centred arched head and a hood mould, a three-light pointed west window with a hood mould, clock faces, two-light pointed bell openings with hood moulds, and an embattled parapet with crocketed corner pinnacles. Inside, there is a Norman chancel arch, which has been remodelled at an unknown date. There is a 12th-century tub font, and mediaeval effigies of a child and an adult couple. The east window has stained glass designed by William Wailes in 1854.

== See also ==
- Grade I listed buildings in the East Riding of Yorkshire
- Listed buildings in Nafferton
