= Listed buildings in Harpham =

Harpham is a civil parish in the county of the East Riding of Yorkshire, England. It contains twelve listed buildings that are recorded in the National Heritage List for England. Of these, one is listed at Grade I, the highest of the three grades, three are at Grade II*, the middle grade, and the others are at Grade II, the lowest grade. The parish contains the village of Harpham, the hamlets of Lowthorpe and Ruston Parva, and the surrounding countryside. The listed buildings consist of three churches, two crosses, houses, farmhouses, a well, and a telephone kiosk.

== Key ==
Grade	Criteria
I	Buildings of exceptional interest, sometimes considered to be internationally important
II*	Particularly important buildings of more than special interest
II	Buildings of national importance and special interest

== Buildings ==
Name and location	Photograph	Date	Notes	Grade
St John of Beverley's Church; 54.03867°N 0.33357°W		12th century	The church has been altered and extended through the centuries, including alterations between 1909 and 1914 by Temple Moore. It is built in stone with some brickwork, and has lead roofs. The church consists of a nave with a south porch, a chancel with a north chapel, and a west tower. The tower has three stages, a triple-chamfered plinth, angle buttresses, string courses, a pointed west window, and a small square headed window on the middle stage. The bell openings have Y-tracery, and above is an embattled parapet.	I
St Martin's Church, Lowthorpe; 54.03202°N 0.35399°W		c.1330	The oldest part of the church is the chancel, the tower was built in the 15th century and raised in the 18th century, the nave was rebuilt and the porch was added in the 19th century. The church is built in sandstone and chalk, the upper part of the tower is in brick, and the roof is in slate. It consists of a west tower and a nave with a south porch, and the chancel is in ruins. The tower has two stages, a double-chamfered plinth, buttresses, a two-light mullioned west window, pointed bell openings with Y-tracery, a stepped cornice, and an embattled parapet with corner obelisks.	II*
Churchyard cross 54.03203°N 0.35370°W	—	Early medieval (probable)	The cross is in the churchyard of St Martin's Church, to the east of the church. It consists of a sandstone pillar, tapering at the top, on which is a Maltese cross, with a fluted arris and a central rosette.	II*
Cross base 54.04065°N 0.37520°W	—	Medieval (probable)	The cross base is in sandstone. It consists of a cubical block with a central socket for a cross shaft.	II
Bracey Bridge Mill Cottage; 54.04149°N 0.35276°W	—	Early 18th century	The house is in stuccoed brick with a pantile roof. There is one storey and attics, and two bays, with a lower bay added to the right. The doorway has a stuccoed surround, with pilasters, roundels and a pediment. The windows are horizontally sliding sashes with channelled wedge lintels and raised keystones, and above are swept roof dormers.	II
Sykes Farmhouse; 54.04018°N 0.33913°W	—	Mid-18th century	The farmhouse is in brick, with stone dressings, a dentilled brick eaves cornice and a pantile roof. There are two storeys and attics, and five bays. The doorway has a rectangular fanlight, to its right is a French window, and the other windows are sashes; three on the upper floor are horizontally sliding. The openings have wedge lintels.	II
West End Farmhouse; 54.04025°N 0.33953°W		Mid-18th century	The farmhouse, which was extended in the mid-19th century, is in red and light brown brick, with a stepped brick eaves cornice, and a pantile roof. There are two storeys, three original bays, and the added bay to the right. The doorway has chamfered fluted pilasters, a blocked fanlight, and a projecting cornice. On the ground floor of the right bay is a casement window under a segmental head, and the other windows are sashes.	II
Outgates Farmhouse; 54.01778°N 0.34981°W	—	1789	The farmhouse is in whitewashed red brick, with a stepped eaves brick cornice and a pantile roof. There is one storey and attics, and four bays. On the front is a doorway, over which is an oculus. The windows are sashes, and above are three sloped roof dormers with casements.	II
Manor Farmhouse; 54.03885°N 0.33310°W		1825	The house is in red brick, with a stepped brick eaves cornice, and a pantile roof. There are two storeys and five bays. The central doorway has fluted pilasters, a fanlight with radial glazing in panelled reveals, and a dentilled pediment on console brackets. The windows are sashes, those on the upper floor horizontally sliding, and they have flat brick arches.	II
St Nicholas' Church, Ruston Parva; 54.03953°N 0.37572°W		1832	The church is in yellow brick on a stone plinth, with a slate roof. It consists of a nave with a bellcote, and a chancel. The windows are pointed and have Y-tracery, and the bellcote has pointed openings with louvres and a pyramidal roof. Inside, there are box pews, and a double-decker pulpit.	II*
Saint John's Well; 54.04030°N 0.32894°W		1856	The well, which has an earlier origin, has a cover consisting of a stone cylinder with a pointed opening and a domed cap. On it is an inscription and the date, and it is enclosed by wrought iron railings.	II
Telephone kiosk 54.03895°N 0.33270°W		1935	The telephone kiosk in Daggert Lane is of the K6 type designed by Giles Gilbert Scott. Constructed in cast iron with a square plan and a dome, it has three unperforated crowns in the top panels.	II
