= Nafferton =

Village and civil parish in the East Riding of Yorkshire, England

Coordinates: 54°01′04″N 0°23′22″W

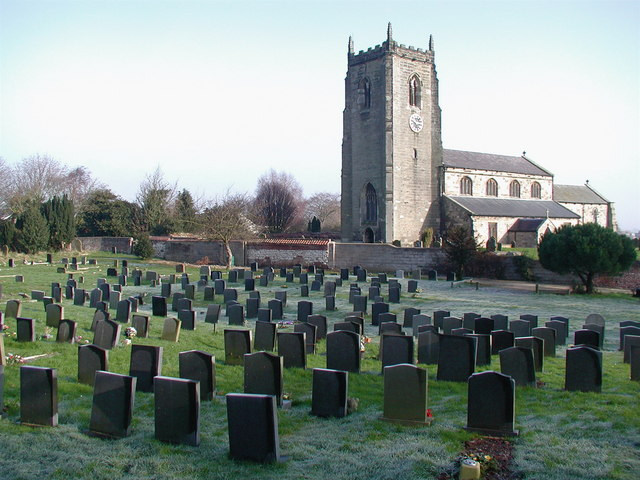
- All Saints Church, Nafferton

- Location within the East Riding of Yorkshire
- Population: 2,433 (2011 census)
- OS grid reference: TA055593
  - London: 175 mi (282 km) S
- Civil parish: Nafferton
- Unitary authority: East Riding of Yorkshire
- Ceremonial county: East Riding of Yorkshire
- Region: Yorkshire and the Humber
- Country: England
- Sovereign state: United Kingdom
- Post town: DRIFFIELD
- Postcode district: YO25
- Dialling code: 01377
- Police: Humberside
- Fire: Humberside
- Ambulance: Yorkshire
- UK Parliament: Bridlington and The Wolds

Nafferton is a village and civil parish in the East Riding of Yorkshire, England. It is situated approximately 2 miles (3.2 km) north-east of Driffield town centre and lies just south of the A614 road.

The village is served by Nafferton railway station on the Yorkshire Coast Line from Hull to Scarborough. According to the 2011 UK Census, Nafferton parish had a population of 2,433, an increase on the 2001 UK Census figure of 2,184.

== History ==
Archaeological evidence for settlement in the area dates back to the Mesolithic. Early hunter-gatherers established temporary camp sites throughout the area, subsisting from woodlands foraging, deer, boars, bears, and wild cattle. The nearby Yorkshire Wolds were later the site of substantial human activity during the Neolithic and the area features burial mounds, with frequent finds of lithic technology.

According to A Dictionary of British Place Names the name Nafferton probably derives from "Nattfari", an Old Norse person name, with "tun", the Old English word for a farmstead or enclosure.

Nafferton is listed in the Domesday Book as "Nadfartone". At the time of the survey the settlement was in the Hundred of Torbar, and the East Riding of Yorkshire. There were 6½ households, 13 villagers, 17½ ploughlands, a meadow, and a mill. In 1066 Karli son of Karli held the Lordship, this had transferred by 1086 to William of Percy, who also became Tenant-in-chief to King William I. A second Domesday entry for Nafferton shows Bark as a further 1066 Lord, whose land and authority had been taken in entirety by William I.

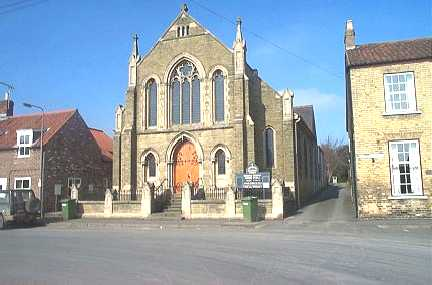
Nafferton Methodist Church

In 1823 Nafferton was a parish in the Wapentake of Dickering. The ecclesiastical parish was under the patronage of the Archbishop of York. A Methodist and an Independent chapel, and a small endowed school existed. Population at the time was 917. Occupations included sixteen farmers & yeomen, two blacksmiths, four bricklayers and one brick maker, two carpenters, six grocers, five shoemakers, three tailors, two drapers, an earthenware dealer, a gardener, a plumber & glazier, a horse dealer, a cabinet maker, a rope & twine and a linen manufacturer, a schoolmaster, and the landlords of The Bell, The Cross Keys, The King's Head, and The white Horse public houses. Residents included the parish curate and two gentlemen. A Hull to Scarborough coach was routed through Nafferton "during the bathing season". A carrier operated between the village and Driffield, and Bridlington, once a week.

The oldest surviving building in the village is the church, parts of which date from the 13th century. The Anglican All Saints' Church, Nafferton was designated a Grade I listed building in 1966 and is now recorded in the National Heritage List for England, maintained by Historic England. Its best-known vicar was the parson-naturalist Francis Orpen Morris (1810–1893), author of highly successful books on birds, butterflies and moths.

The Mere, a large expanse of water fed by natural springs, was formerly a mill pond. The mere is drained via sluice gates into a mill race running through private gardens. The race feeds a non-functioning but still existing wood and steel overshot waterwheel. The mill race drains into Nafferton Beck, and subsequently into the River Hull

== Transport ==
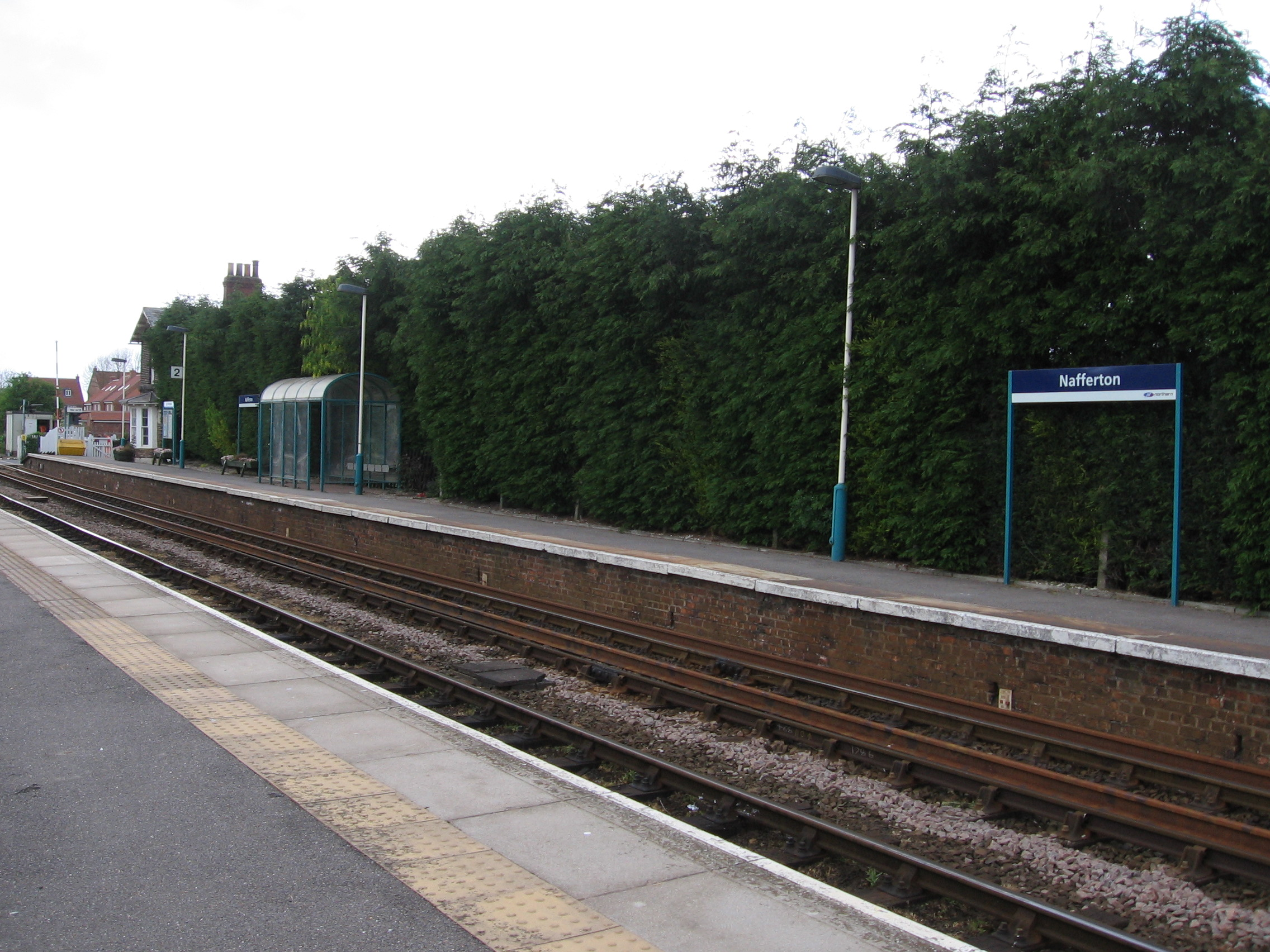
Nafferton Railway Station

Nafferton has bus and train services. Nafferton railway station has regular train services to Bridlington, Beverley and Hull with several running through to Scarborough, Doncaster, Meadowhall and Sheffield. Nafferton also has buses to Beverley, Hull, Bridlington, Scarborough and York (EYMS 121, 45/46, 270).

== See also ==
- Listed buildings in Nafferton
