= Dickering Wapentake =

Former administrative division of Yorkshire, England

Coordinates: 54.091°N 0.383°W

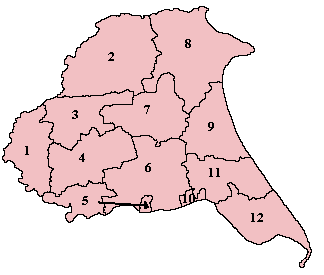
Wapentakes of the East Riding of Yorkshire. Dickering is marked 8.

Dickering was a wapentake (which is an administrative division) of the historic East Riding of Yorkshire in England, consisting of the north-east part of that county, including the towns of Bridlington and Filey; its territory is now partly in the modern East Riding and partly in North Yorkshire. It was established in 12th or 13th century by combining the three ancient Domesday hundreds of Burton, Huntou (Hunthow) and Torbar. The Wapentake of Dickering ceased to have much significance in the 19th century when the wapentakes were superseded by other administrative divisions for most local government purposes.

Dickering consisted of the parishes of Argam, Bempton, Bessingby, Boynton, Bridlington, Burton Agnes, Burton Fleming, Carnaby, Flamborough, Folkton, Foston on the Wolds, Foxholes, Ganton, Garton on the Wolds, Hunmanby, Kilham, Langtoft, Lowthorpe, Muston, Nafferton, Reighton, Rudston, Ruston Parva, Thwing, Willerby and Wold Newton, and part of the parish of Filey.
