= Listed buildings in Salton, North Yorkshire =

Salton is a civil parish in the county of North Yorkshire, England. It contains seven listed buildings that are recorded in the National Heritage List for England. Of these, one is listed at Grade I, the highest of the three grades, and the others are at Grade II, the lowest grade. The parish contains the village of Salton and the surrounding countryside. All the listed buildings are in the village, and consist of a church, tombs in the churchyard, farmhouses and associated structures, and a bridge.

== Key ==
| Grade | Criteria |
|---|---|
| I | Buildings of exceptional interest, sometimes considered to be internationally important |
| II | Buildings of national importance and special interest |

== Buildings ==
| Name and location | Photograph | Date | Notes | Grade |
|---|---|---|---|---|
| St John of Beverley's Church; 54.21051°N 0.90301°W | | Early 12th century | The church has been altered and expanded through the centuries, including a restoration by C. Hodgson Fowler in 1881. It is built in sandstone, with a lead roof to the tower, and tile roofs to the body of the church. The church consists of a nave, a south porch, a chancel and a west tower. The tower has two stages, clasping buttresses, a three-light west window, lancet windows, a string course, louvred bell openings with round heads, a corbel table, an embattled parapet, and a pyramidal roof with a cross. The south porch has a round-arched doorway with two orders, and on the chancel is a round-arched priest's door with imposts. | I |
| Harrison and Taylor table tombs 54.21041°N 0.90292°W | — | Mid-18th century | A group of three stone table tombs in the churchyard of St John of Beverley's Church, to the south of the church. They commemorate members of the Harrison and Taylor families, and have moulded covers raised on panelled ends between half-baluster brackets. | II |
| Manor Farmhouse; 54.21052°N 0.90410°W | — | 18th century | The farmhouse was extended in the 19th century. The early part is in sandstone and raised in red brick, the extension is in red brick, the roofs are in pantile, and there are two storeys. The early part has quoins, five bays, a doorway with fluted attached columns, a blocked radial fanlight, and a cornice hood on paired consoles. This is flanked by bow windows in fluted frames with paterae, and on the upper floor are sash windows. The extension has three bays and sash windows. At the rear is a doorway with reeded pilasters and a cornice hood, and a Venetian window. | II |
| Gates and gate piers north of Manor Farmhouse; 54.21111°N 0.90390°W | — | Early 19th century | The gates and gate piers are in cast iron. The piers have a square plan, they are about 1.75 metres (5 ft 9 in) in height, and have diamond lattice-work sides with flat tops and Grecian urn finials. The ramped-up gates have turned railings with pointed tips. | II |
| Gates and gate piers northwest of Manor Farmhouse; 54.21051°N 0.90519°W | — | Early 19th century | The gates and gate piers are in cast iron. The piers have a square plan, they are about 1.75 metres (5 ft 9 in) in height, and they have alternate bands of open-work crosses and key motifs and shallow pyramidal caps. The gates have turned railings with pointed tips. | II |
| Salton Bridge; 54.21046°N 0.90541°W | | Early 19th century | The bridge carries a track over the River Dove. It is in red brick on sandstone cutwaters and abutments. The bridge consists of two round arches between canted abutments, and two segmental flood arches over the left bank abutment. The bridge has a plain parapet with cambered coping, and square end piers. | II |
| Red House Farmhouse; 54.21070°N 0.90200°W | | c. 1840 | The farmhouse is in red and cream brick on a sandstone plinth, with red brick on the returns, and a hipped slate roof. There are two storeys and three bays. The central doorway has pilasters, a divided fanlight and a cornice hood. The windows are sashes with wedge lintels. | II |
