= Harpham =

Village and civil parish in the East Riding of Yorkshire, England

Coordinates: 54°02′24″N 0°20′03″W

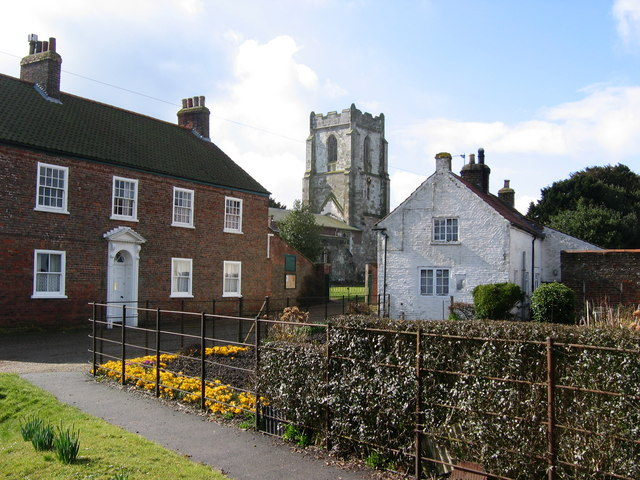

- Location within the East Riding of Yorkshire
- Population: 303 (2011 census)
- OS grid reference: TA092617
  - London: 175 mi (282 km) S
- Civil parish: Harpham
- Unitary authority: East Riding of Yorkshire
- Ceremonial county: East Riding of Yorkshire
- Region: Yorkshire and the Humber
- Country: England
- Sovereign state: United Kingdom
- Post town: DRIFFIELD
- Postcode district: YO25
- Dialling code: 01262
- Police: Humberside
- Fire: Humberside
- Ambulance: Yorkshire
- UK Parliament: Bridlington and The Wolds

Harpham is a small village and civil parish in the East Riding of Yorkshire, England. It is located just south of the A614 road, approximately 5 miles (8 km) north-east of Driffield and 7 miles (11 km) south-west of Bridlington.

The civil parish is formed by the village of Harpham and the hamlets of Lowthorpe and Ruston Parva. According to the 2011 UK census, Harpham parish had a population of 303, a decline on the 2001 UK census figure of 318.

== History ==
The village appears in the Domesday Book of 1086 as belonging to King William the Conqueror, and having 29 ploughlands. The name of the village is thought to derive from the Old English Hearpe-hām, meaning the Salt-Harp village or farmstead. Although not on the coast, the proximity of the Holderness coastline is thought to be the influence of the salt. Three Roman mosaics were found near Harpham in 1905, and three more were discovered in 1950. The first three are now in the Hull and East Riding Museum. They are simply patterned. One represented a rectangular maze, one of only five examples known in Roman mosaics in Britain.

It is here that St John of Beverley was born in the 7th century; he became the Bishop of Hexham as well as the Bishop of York.

St John of Beverley's Church, Harpham is dedicated to him and was designated a Grade I listed building in 1966, and is now recorded in the National Heritage List for England, maintained by Historic England. The Well of St. John, the local well, is named after him and is believed by many to have healing powers. The well is designated as a Grade II listed building.

In 1823, Harpham was a civil parish in the Wapentake of Dickering. The St. Quintin family were lords of Harpham. The foundations of the St. Quintin mansion were recorded as being to the west of the church. The church contains St. Quintin burials in the north aisle and a stained glass window to Sir William St Quintin Bt., twenty-eighth in succession, who died in 1777. Baines also notes the village as being wholly agricultural, with a population of 251. Occupations included eight farmers, two grocers, two shoemakers, a blacksmith, a wheelwright, a tailor, a butcher, and the landlord of the St. Quintin Arms public house. There was also a linen manufacturer. A carrier operated between the village and Bridlington once a week. The nearest railway station was at Burton Agnes on the Hull to Scarborough line, but this closed in January 1970. Now, the nearest station is at Driffield.

The village gave its name to HMS Harpham, a Ham class minesweeper.

== See also ==
- Listed buildings in Harpham
