= Christopher Levett =

English writer, explorer and naval captain

Captain Christopher Levett
- Born: 5 April 1586; York, England
- Died: 1630 (aged 43–44) aboard the Porcupine, Atlantic Ocean
- Resting place: buried at sea
- Occupations: English naval captain, explorer, author
- Known for: explorer of New England; granted 6,000 acres to settle Colony of York (now Portland, Maine), 15 May 1623
- Title: Captain; His Majesty's Woodward of Somersetshire; Principal, Plymouth Council for New England
- Spouse(s): Mercy Levett (née More); Frances Levett (née Lottisham)
- Children: Sarah Levett Hitch; Mary Levett; Rev. Jeremiah Levett; Timothy Levett; Elizabeth Levett
- Parent(s): Percival Levett, Elizabeth (née Rotherforth) Levett

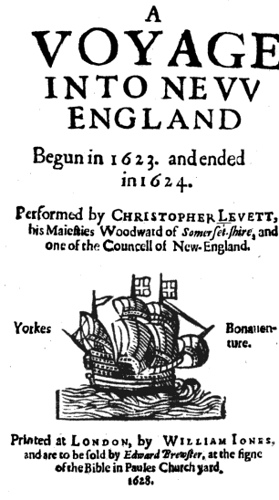
Frontispiece, A Voyage into New-England, Begun in 1623, and Ended in 1624, Performed by Christopher Levett, his Majesties Woodward of Somersetshire, and one of the Councell of New-England

Captain Christopher Levett (15 April 1586 – 1630) was an English writer, explorer and naval captain, born at York, England. He explored the coast of New England and secured a grant from the king to settle present-day Portland, Maine, the first European to do so. Levett left behind a group of settlers at his Maine plantation in Casco Bay, but they were never heard from again. Their fate is unknown. As a member of the Plymouth Council for New England, Levett was named the Governor of Plymouth in 1623 and a close adviser to Capt. Robert Gorges in his attempt to found an early English colony at Weymouth, Massachusetts, which also failed. Levett was also named an early governor of Virginia in 1628, according to Parliamentary records at Whitehall.

== Life ==
Levett was the son of Elizabeth and Percival Levett, a York merchant and innkeeper, and was admitted a freeman of York as a merchant himself. Levett was also admitted to the Company of Merchant Adventurers in the City of York, along with his brother Percival. There is evidence that the English attempts to colonise North America caught Levett's interest even while a York merchant. Rev. Alexander Whitaker, an early Anglican minister and English immigrant to the Virginia Colony made note in his will of 1610 that he owed a debt of some £5 to "Christopher Levite, a linen draper of the city of York."

Perhaps Levett's contact with Whitaker and other Englishmen stoked his zeal to become an explorer. Levett apparently grew restless, and instead turned his sights towards a career as an explorer. He served as His Majesty's Woodward of Somersetshire to King James I, and wrote a tract on timber harvesting that became the standard for selection of trees for the Royal Navy.

Later, operating from his adopted home in Sherborne, Dorset, in the shadow of Sir Walter Raleigh and other adventurers, Levett became interested in the colonisation of New England. Levett became associated with Sir Ferdinando Gorges and was appointed to the Council for New England. He was granted 6,000 acres (24 km^{2}) of land by King James I of England for a settlement in present-day Maine, which Levett proposed to call "York" after his birth city.

On 5 May 1623, records for the Council on New England say, "Christopher Levett to be a principal patentee; and to have a grant of 6,000 acres of land." The next month, on 26 June 1623, the records note "the King judges well of the undertaking in New England, and more particularly of a design of Christopher Levett, one of the Council for settling that plantation, to build a city and call it York." The king proclaimed that Anglican churches across England should take up collections to aid Levett in his settlement attempts.

Levett was helped with his settlement ambitions, according to some historians, thanks to a deepening friendship with George Villiers, 1st Duke of Buckingham, the favoured courtier who acted as advocate for the young Yorkshireman. Levett's alliance to a powerful patron probably accounted for Levett's move to Sherborne and his appointment in the Royal forest in Somersetshire, putting him closer to Gorges and other early adventurers.

On 26 June 1623, Secretary of State Lord Conway wrote to Lord Scrope, President of the Council of the North, urging him to assist Levett in his plan to settle a plantation in New England with a company of Yorkshiremen and found "a Citty and call it by the name of Yorke." Noted the historian Charles Herbert Levermore: "So the first New York that was planned for America was to be located in Portland harbor."

Oblivious to the 'city upon a hill' spiritual messaging of early Puritan founders of the Massachusetts Bay Colony, Sir Ferdinando Gorges, his partner John Mason, and other merchant adventurers zeroed in on profit. From what we know of Levett, he seems more nuanced: his dealings with Native Americans seem particularly solicitous, especially given the era, and his first wife, Mercy More, was the daughter of a prominent Puritan rector.

Nevertheless, either out of an explorer's zeal or a businessman's gimlet eye, Levett forged ahead. To further his plans, the Naval captain embarked from England on a trip to explore the coast of New England, paying particular attention to present-day Maine and New Hampshire.

When he returned to England, he wrote a book called "A Voyage into New England, Begun in 1623, and Ended in 1624, Performed by Christopher Levett, His Majesty's Woodward of Somersetshire, and One of the Council of New England." It was Levett's hope to stir settlement in the New World, and he hoped as the principal patentee (and first settler) of present-day Portland, Maine, to benefit financially from the arrangement.

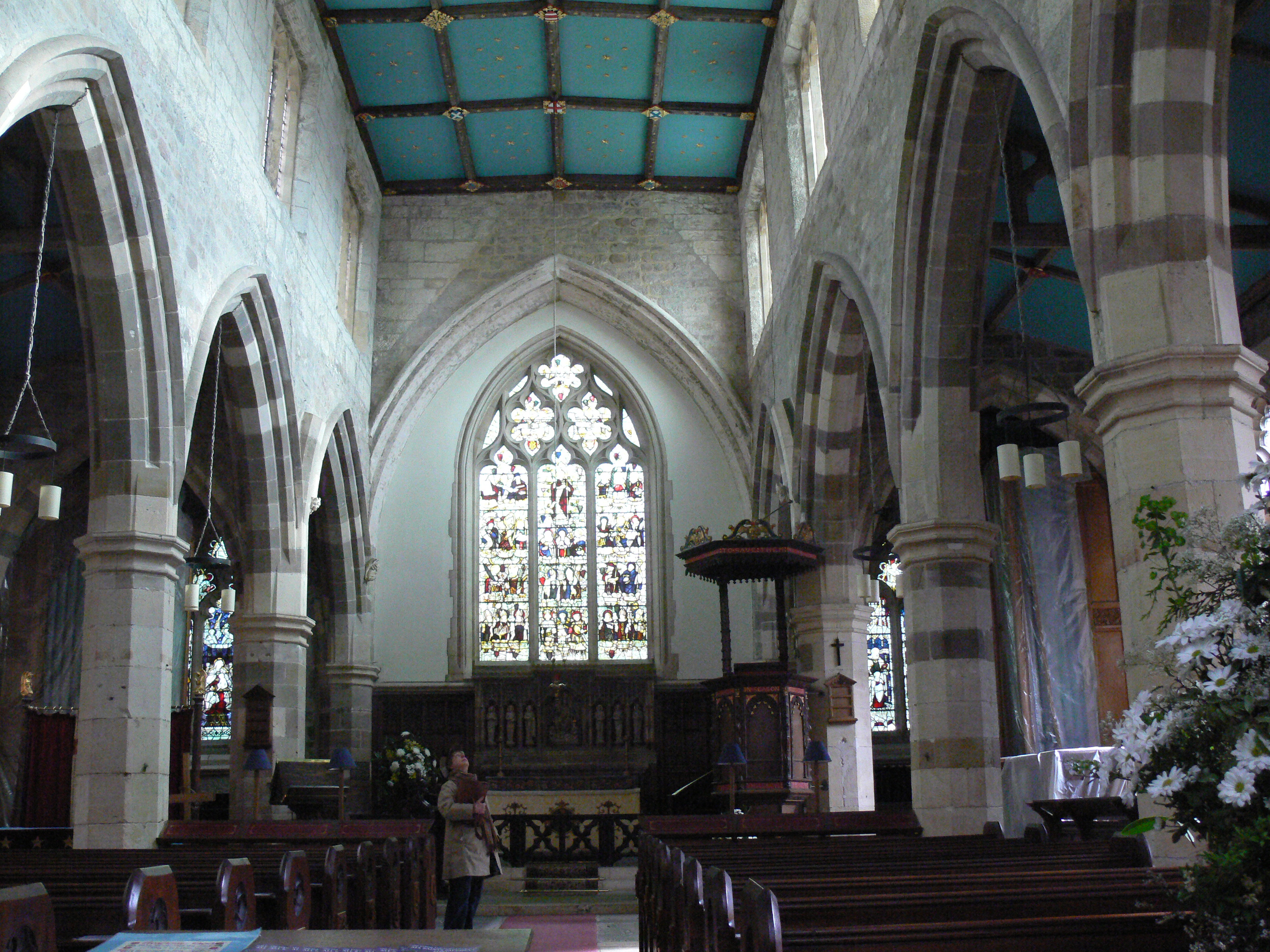
All Saints' Church, Pavement, York, baptism of Christopher Levett, 5 April 1586

On the surface, Capt. Levett seemed ideally placed to push such settlement. "When A Description of New England was published in London in 1616," write Charles and Samuella Shain of Capt. John Smith's book, "it was only a question of time before another enterprising spirit would arrive who would realize Captain John Smith's plans for founding a permanent settlement on the Maine coast.... Better placed socially and therefore politically than John Smith, Levett was also richer."

Levett apparently had his eye on New England's thriving fisheries, which English merchants had exploited for years. The naval captain reported to Gorges that with the region's best fishing in the winter months, settling a permanent colony would enable the merchant adventurers to double their profits, by enabling the ships to fish year round.

But despite his better connections, the tide of history was not in his favour. His salesmanship fell short. Public interest waned, as new settlements in Virginia and elsewhere took center stage. King Charles I's growing problems ate away at interest in colonisation. The king's appeal for money in Yorkshire parishes to support the Levett scheme never yielded much. The gathering storm of Roundhead rebellion put Levett's benefactors under strain.

In the meantime Levett was assigned to more pressing matters in England. On 5 October 1625, Capt. Levett was at the helm of HMS Susan and Ellen as part of Lord Wimbledon's fleet of 80 English and 16 Dutch vessels sailing against the Spanish fleet at Cádiz. The expedition, mounted by King Charles I who pressured his subjects to fund it, was an abject failure, and the fleet returned to England in disgrace. Levett later complained bitterly of the experience, claiming that even as a Royal Navy captain, he'd been treated "no better than a meare slave" by those in charge.

Levett never returned to Maine, and the small group of men he left behind in a stone house were never heard from again. Levett's patented lands eventually passed to a group of Plymouth merchants as Levett's attention was diverted to more pressing Naval matters. Eventually Levett returned to the Massachusetts Bay Colony, where he met with Governor John Winthrop in 1630, and he died aboard the return voyage home. The body of the early adventurer was buried at sea, and his wife was forced to appear at a Bristol court the following year to recover his effects.

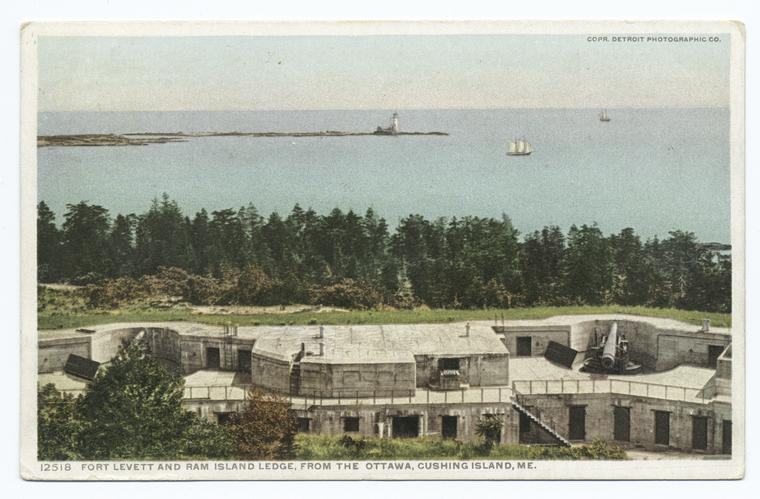
Fort Levett and Ram Island Ledge, Cushing Island, Maine, 1909

Fort Levett on Cushing Island, Maine in Portland Harbor is named for this early explorer. Present-day York County, Maine, derives its name from Capt. Levett's early appellation for his Maine settlement.

Even in death, Capt. Levett could not avoid the controversies roiling the age. Letters he carried aboard the vessel Porcupine, addressed by John Winthrop and other leaders of the Massachusetts Bay Colony to sympathetic friends in England, fell into the hands of Puritan foes in England, apparently after Levett's possessions were searched after his death. The letters stirred up some measure of controversy in England for the unfavorable stance the writers took toward the English church.

Capt. Levett had six children, four by his first wife Mercy More, who was the daughter of Rev. Robert More, a Puritan rector in Guiseley, Yorkshire. He married a second time to Frances Lottisham, daughter of Oliver Lottisham of Somersetshire, and by her he had another two children. A son, Jeremiah (Jeremy), graduated from Trinity College, Cambridge, and became the rector of Leyton, Essex. His daughter Sarah married the Right Rev. Robert Hitch, Rector of Normanton, West Riding of Yorkshire and later Dean of York.

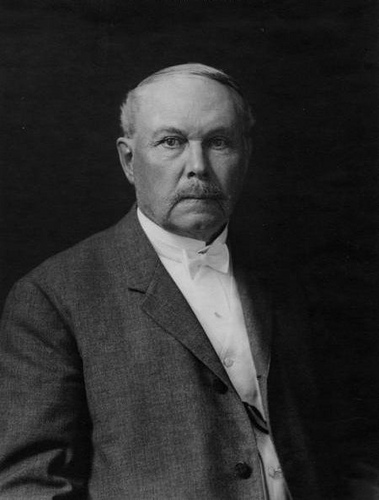
James Phinney Baxter, mayor, Portland, Maine, and Maine historian
