= George Crowle =

British Whig politician

Personal details
- Born: 1696
- Died: 1754

George Crowle (11 May 1696 – 1754), of Springhead, near Hull, Yorkshire was a British Whig politician who sat in the House of Commons from 1724 to 1747.

== Early life ==
Crowle was the eldest son of William Crowle, merchant of Hull, and his wife Dorothy Oates, daughter of Richard Oates of Pontefract. His father served as chamberlain of the borough of Hull in 1688 and 1689. His grandfather, Alderman George Crowle, was sheriff of Kingston upon Hull in 1657, and mayor in 1661 and 1679, Crowle married his cousin Ellennor.

== Career ==
Crowle stood for Kingston upon Hull at the 1722 British general election but was unsuccessful. He was returned two years later as Member of Parliament for Hull at a fiercely contested by-election on 23 January 1724 and was returned again in a contest at the 1727 British general election. In Parliament he supported Walpole, who gave him a place as Commissioner for Victualling the Navy in 1732. At the 1734 British general election he was returned again in a contest at Hull. He was appointed an extra Commissioner of the navy in 1738 and in 1740 as comptroller of storekeepers’ accounts for the navy instead, a post he retained until 1752. At the 1741 British general election he was returned unopposed at Hull. By the House of Commons Disqualification Act 1741 (15 Geo. 2. c. 22), his post became incompatible with a place in Parliament at the 1747 British general election so he vacated his seat and gave his interest to the government candidate, Lord Robert Manners against his brother Richard. He was getting into debt and in 1752 he became a consul at Lisbon, probably to avoid his creditors. It was said he was ignorant of mercantile affairs and took sides with the Portuguese against Britain.

== Death and legacy ==
Crowle died heavily in debt on 18 July 1754, leaving two sons and a daughter. His sister Elisabeth married Daniel Wilson, another MP.

Parliament of Great Britain
| Preceded by Sir William St Quintin; Nathaniel Rogers | Member of Parliament for Kingston upon Hull; 1724–1727; With: Nathaniel Rogers 1724-1727; Joseph Micklethwaite 1727-1734; Henry Maister 1734-1741; William Carter 1741-1744; Harry Pulteney 1744-1747 | Succeeded by Lord Robert Manners; Thomas Carter |
