= Allocamelus =

Heraldic beast

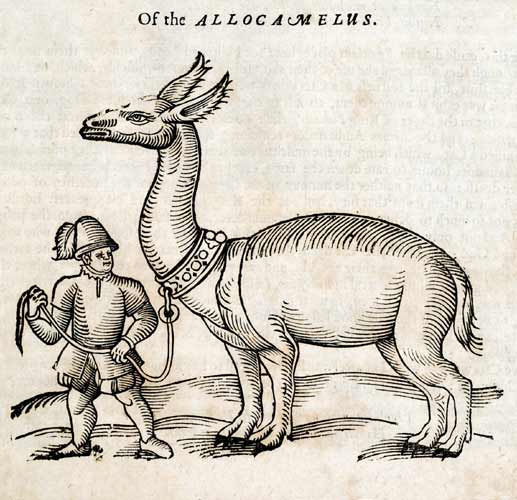
Allocamelus from Edward Topsell's The History of Four-footed Beasts and Serpents, 1658. The image was originally from a Dutch work published in 1558. Topsell believed that the creature was the offspring of a camel and mule.

In heraldry, the Allocamelus (a.k.a. Ass-Camel) was the depiction of a mythical creature with the head of a donkey and the body of a camel. It was first used as a crest for the English Eastland Company because only people from this company have reported seeing it. Later the Russia Company adopted it.
