= Listed buildings in Muston, North Yorkshire =

Muston is a civil parish in the county of North Yorkshire, England. It contains twelve listed buildings that are recorded in the National Heritage List for England. All the listed buildings are designated at Grade II, the lowest of the three grades, which is applied to "buildings of national importance and special interest". The parish contains the village of Muston and the surrounding area. Apart from a milestone, all the listed buildings are in the village, and they consist of a church, houses and farmhouses.

== Buildings ==
Name and location	Photograph	Date	Notes
Milestone; 54.18491°N 0.34400°W		Medieval	The milestone on the north side of White Gate Hill is in limestone. It is about 1.5 metres (4 ft 11 in) tall, roughly-shaped and with a semicircular head.
Appleby's; 54.20139°N 0.31574°W	—	1724	A farmhouse, later a private house, it has a cruck frame encased in rendered chalk, and a concrete pantile roof. There are two storeys and two bays. The central doorway is flanked by sash windows, and on the upper floor are horizontally-sliding sashes. To the right is a square recessed initialled datestone.
6 and 7 Hunmanby Street; 54.20024°N 0.32158°W		1736	A house divided into two, it is rendered and colourwashed, on a plinth, with quoins, a floor band, and a pantile roof. There are two storeys, three bays, and a rear outshut. On the front are two doorways, one with a fanlight, the other to the left inserted later, and the windows are sashes. All the original openings have keystones. Above the original doorway is a recessed rectangular inscribed datestone with a rounded architrave and a keystone.
Bank House; 54.19995°N 0.32216°W	—	1738	A farmhouse, later a private home, in colourwashed rendered chalk on a plinth, with quoins, a chamfered plinth band, a floor band, a modillion eaves course, and a concrete pantile roof with shaped kneelers and coped gables. There are two storeys and four bays. On the front is a porch with octagonal columns and a cornice. The windows are sashes with keystones, and on the upper floor is a square initialled datestone in an architrave with a keystone.
Ashley Cottage; 54.20009°N 0.32200°W	—	18th century	A range of cottages and outbuildings combined into one house, it is whitewashed on brick on the left and on chalk to the right. The left part has two storeys and three bays, and the right part has one storey and an attic and two bays. The doorway is near the centre, there is one sash window, the others are horizontally-sliding sashes, and on the upper floor is a half-dormer.
Forge Cottage and Wellbank House; 54.20008°N 0.32168°W	—	18th century	A house divided into two, it has a cruck frame encased in stone and raised in brick, with quoins, and a pantile roof with coped gables and shaped kneelers. There are two storeys and three bays. On the front are two doorways, the windows are a mix of casements and horizontally-sliding sashes, and there is a blocked fire window. All the ground floor openings have painted wedge lintels. In the left gable wall are two windows with gauged brick heads and keystones.
Mount Pleasant Farmhouse; 54.20171°N 0.31309°W		Mid-18th century	The farmhouse is in sandstone with a tumbled brick gable on the right and a pantile roof. There are two storeys and three bays. The doorway has a gabled porch on brackets, and the windows are horizontal-sliding sashes, those on the ground floor with wedge lintels.
Muston Hall; 54.19990°N 0.32019°W		18th century	The house is in whitewashed stone with a whitewashed extension and a hipped slate roof. The main block has two storeys and three bays, and the extension to the right has a single bay. In the centre is Doric portico and a doorway with a traceried fanlight, and above it is a wrought iron balcony and a round-headed stair window. The other windows are sashes in architraves.
West House Farmhouse; 54.20111°N 0.32180°W		1752	The farmhouse is in whitewashed rendered chalk on a plinth, with a floor band, an extension in brick, and a tile roof with coped gables and moulded kneelers. There are two storeys, three bays and a rear extension. On the front is a doorway with a fanlight, and sash windows, all with keystones. Above the doorway is a recessed square initialled datestone in an architrave. Inside, there is a large inglenook fireplace.
Former Cross Keys Inn; 54.20130°N 0.31623°W	—	1755	The inn, later a private house, is in rendered chalk on a stone plinth, with a pantile roof and coped gables. There are two storeys, four bays and an outshut. The doorway has a fanlight and an open pediment on corbels. The windows are sashes, and on the upper floor is a recessed square initialled datestone.
White Horse Cottage; 54.19937°N 0.32242°W	—	1776	The house is in sandstone, and has a pantile roof with shaped kneelers and coped gables. There are two storeys and three bays. The doorway is in the centre, the windows are 20th-century pivot windows, and all the openings have lintels and keystones. On the upper floor is a recessed square initialled datestone.
All Saints' Church; 54.20127°N 0.31879°W		1863–64	The church is built in limestone on a moulded chamfered plinth and has a slate roof. It consists of a nave, north and south aisles, a south porch, a chancel and a vestry. On the west gable is a gabled bellcote with two pointed arches on colonnettes, and a clock face on the east side. Inside the porch are two re-set medieval carved heads.
