= Argam =

Former parish in the East Riding of Yorkshire, England

Coordinates: 54.125°N 0.299°W

- Civil parish (defunct)
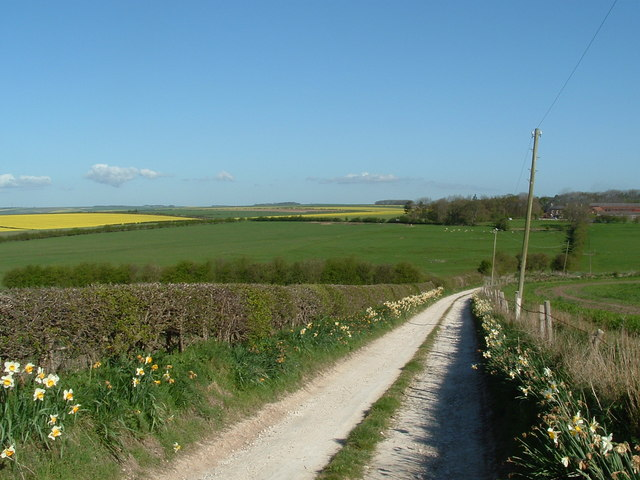
- Argam village site

- Location within the East Riding of Yorkshire
- Population: 34 (1931 Census)
- OS grid reference: TA113713
- Civil parish: Grindale
- Unitary authority: East Riding of Yorkshire
- Ceremonial county: East Riding of Yorkshire
- Region: Yorkshire and the Humber
- Country: England
- Sovereign state: United Kingdom

Argam, or Argham (sometimes Ergam, or Ergham), was a village and civil parish, now in the parish of Grindale, in the East Riding of Yorkshire, England. The site is listed in many historical documents, but was deserted by the early 19th century. The village was depopulated, becoming one of the known deserted Medieval villages in Yorkshire.

== History ==
Argam is mentioned in the Domesday Book as being part of the Hundred or Torbar. Torbar was later joined with the hundreds of Burton and Huntou to form the wapentake of Dickering. The parish was bisected along a north-east/south-west axis by Argham Dykes (or Ergham Dykes), a Bronze Age earthwork that extends from Reighton in the north-east, to Rudston in the south west. The dyke, which was historically called the Argham Cursus, is now a scheduled monument. The dyke is believed to be pre-Roman, however in 1869, some Roman coins were unearthed from the dyke inside a mole-hill, which led to some assuming a Roman-built dyke. Pitt Rivers argues that if you stand on the dyke at Argam, "the whole of the wide extent of country which presents itself to the eye from this point, the whole of the ground appears as if it had been scooped out by nature for the defence of an army facing inland and westwards...."

The parish was listed as having a church (dedicated to St John the Baptist), which was still extant in 1318 according to an ecclesiastical tax record of the Diocese of York. In 1115, Walter de Gant, granted some land in the parish, and all the chapels of Hunmanby, to the order at Bardney Abbey. However, like the village, the church building has been demolished, but the font, described as a "rough bowl", was moved into the Church of St Nicholas in Grindale. Whilst the location of the village can be identified from the outlines of the building walls in the ground, the exact location of the church is undetermined. Because the village of Argam had a church, the name of the area persisted beyond the destruction of the dwellings. Other lost Medieval settlements, lost their village or parish names if they did not have a church. The rights of the clergy in the parish were known to have been severely curtailed by 1632, by which time, no buildings existed in Argam village. The Archbishop of York left the decision of whether to hold religious services in the parish or not, to the incumbent vicar. One did exercise this right, preaching an open-air sermon on the site of the village in 1743.

Historically, the parish, and village or Argam, led to the surname Ergome, such as John of Ergome, who was a renowned scholar and Augustinian friar who studied at Bologna. Ergome came from a distinguished East Riding family. Sir William Erghum, a nobleman from the parish, was the maternal grandfather of Katherine Constable, part of the prominent family in Yorkshire and Lincolnshire. The parish and village have been recorded as being Ergone, Ergum, Erghum, Herghum, Ereghom, and Arholme. The name derives from Old Norse meaning At the shielings. Argam covered approximately 500 acres (200 ha), being some 5.5 miles (8.9 km) north-west of Bridlington, near to the old road from Bridlington to Malton. The village was de-populated by end of the Middle Ages, possibly for sheep-farming, which was the main use of the area listed in the Domesday Book. Argam village does not appear in taxation records after the 15th century. (Note: The land in and around Argam was owned by the order at Bardney Abbey. A document from 1632 of Latin inscription declares the land abandoned.) Between 1801 and 1901, the population, which was scattered across the remaining homesteads in the parish, remained static numbering between 20 and 40 people. The census of 1901 details 40 people living in the parish (which had also grown to an area of 559 acres (226 ha)). The 40 people living in the parish were distributed across only six households or dwellings. On 1 April 1935, the parish was dissolved, and the area subsumed into the parish of Grindale, which still exists as an area in the East Riding of Yorkshire. The last population census of the parish was conducted in 1931, and recorded 34 people.

The remains of the village can be found at two grid coordinates: TA112710 and TA113713.
