= Listed buildings in Nafferton =

Nafferton is a civil parish in the county of the East Riding of Yorkshire, England. It contains 22 listed buildings that are recorded in the National Heritage List for England. Of these, one is listed at Grade I, the highest of the three grades, and the others are at Grade II, the lowest grade. The parish contains the village of Nafferton and the surrounding countryside. Most of the listed buildings are houses and associated structures, and the others include a church and its churchyard wall, a public house, a former windmill, and a former railway station and associated structures.

== Key ==
Grade	Criteria
I	Buildings of exceptional interest, sometimes considered to be internationally important
II	Buildings of national importance and special interest

== Buildings ==
Name and location	Photograph	Date	Notes	Grade
All Saints' Church; 54.01630°N 0.39057°W		12th century	The church has been altered and extended through the centuries, including a restoration in 1882–83 by Temple Moore. It is built in stone with slate roofs, and consists of a nave with a clerestory, north and south aisles, north and south porches, a chancel and a west tower. The tower has a moulded plinth, diagonal buttresses, a west doorway with a moulded surround, a four-centred arched head and a hood mould, a three-light pointed west window with a hood mould, clock faces, two-light pointed bell openings with hood moulds, and an embattled parapet with crocketed corner pinnacles. Inside, there is a Norman chancel arch.	I
Stable southwest of Pockthorpe Hall; 54.04597°N 0.39793°W	—	Early 18th century	The stable is in red brick, with stone dressings, a stepped eaves cornice, and a pantile roof with crow-stepped gables and block and ball finials. There are two storeys and two bays. On the front is a doorway with a segmental head, and on the upper floor is a similar taking-in door.	II
11 Coppergate; 54.01672°N 0.38875°W	—	Mid-18th century	The house is in yellow-brown brick, with a dentilled brick eaves cornice, and a pattie roof with tumbled-in brick to the raised gables. There is one storey and attics, and two bays. The doorway is in the centre and flanked by horizontally sliding sash windows, all under timber wedge lintels. Above the doorway is a partly illegible datestone, and there are two roof dormers with sliding sash windows.	II
20 Middle Street; 54.01790°N 0.38953°W		Mid-18th century	The house is in brown brick, with stepped brick eaves cornices, and a swept pantile roof with tumbled-in brick to the raised gables. There are two storeys and two bays, and a single-storey single-bay extension to the right. In the centre of the main block is a doorway, and there is another doorway on the extension. The windows are horizontally sliding sashes; those flanking the doorway are tripartite.	II
34 Middle Street; 54.01872°N 0.38984°W	—	Mid-18th century	The house is in whitewashed brick, with a dentilled brick eaves cornice and a pantile roof. There are two storeys and two bays. Steps lead up to the central doorway, and to the right is a lower doorway with a rectangular fanlight. The windows are sashes, those on the upper floor horizontally sliding. The ground floor openings have segmental heads.	II
2 North Street; 54.02120°N 0.39147°W	—	Mid-18th century	The house is in brown brick with a pantile roof. There are two storeys, attics and a basement, and three bays. The central doorway has reeded pilasters and a pediment, and the windows are sashes under cambered lintels.	II
19 Westgate; 54.01523°N 0.39126°W	—	Mid-18th century	The house is in whitewashed brick with a stepped brick eaves cornice and a pantile roof. There are two storeys and attics, and two bays. The central doorway has pilasters and an entablature. The windows are sashes with segmental heads, and above are the roof dormers with gables and decorative bargeboards.	II
Nafferton Kesters Farmhouse; 54.04597°N 0.39793°W	—	Mid-18th century	The house is in brown brick, partly rendered, with a stepped brick eaves cornice, and a pantile roof with tumbled-in brick to the raised gables. There are two storeys and three bays. On the front is a doorway, and the windows are horizontally sliding sashes, tripartite on the ground floor.	II
The Blue Bell Public House; 54.01547°N 0.39083°W		Mid-18th century	The public house is in whitewashed brick, with a dentilled brick eaves cornice, and a pantile roof with tumbled-in brick to the raised gables. The doorway has a timber architrave and a rectangular fanlight, and the windows are sashes. The ground floor openings are under flat gauged brick arches.	II
7 Middle Street; 54.01764°N 0.38986°W	—	Late 18th century	The house is in colourwashed brick, with a dentilled brick eaves cornice, and a pantile roof, catslide at the rear. There are two storeys and three bays, and a rear outshut. The central doorway has a rectangular fanlight, above it is a blocked window, and the other windows are sashes. The windows are in architraves, and those on the ground floor are under wedge lintels.	II
24 Middle Street; 54.01830°N 0.38966°W	—	Late 18th century	The house is in light brown brick, with stone dressings, a dentilled brick eaves cornice, sprocketed eaves, a pantile roof, and a catslide roof at the rear. There are two storeys and three bays. The central doorway has a rectangular fanlight, the windows are horizontally sliding sashes, and the ground floor openings are under wedge lintels.	II
Nethertoft; 54.01597°N 0.39001°W	—	Late 18th century	The house is in rendered brick, with a stepped brick eaves cornice, and a pantile roof. There are two storeys and four bays. The main doorway has pilasters, a rectangular fanlight, and a shallow moulded cornice. The windows are sashes, on the ground floor with cambered lintels, and, on the upper floor, one is horizontally sliding.	II
31 Middle Street; 54.01893°N 0.39019°W		1777	The house is in brown brick, with a stepped brick eaves cornice and a pantile roof. There are two storeys and three bays. On the front are two doorways, to the left is a shop window, and the other windows are sashes. The ground floor openings have wedge lintels and raised keystones, and the upper floor windows are in architraves. Over the doorway is an initialled datestone.	II
33 Middle Street; 54.01906°N 0.39018°W	—	1778	The house, which was later extended, is in red brick with a pantile roof. There are two storeys, the original block has three bays, and the extension to the right has two bays. The doorway, with an oblong fanlight, is in the centre of the original block, there is a blocked doorway on the extension, and the windows are sashes. The ground floor openings and the windows on the upper floor of the extension are under cambered gauged brick arches, and the other windows are in architraves. Over the doorway is an initialled datestone.	II
Stable, 53 Westgate; 54.01378°N 0.39409°W	—	1790	The stable is in red brick, with a stepped brick eaves cornice and a pantile roof with tumbled-in brick to the raised gables with rounded saddles. There are two storeys and four bays. The stable contains opposing entrances, a doorway with a segmental head, slit vents and taking-in doors. Above the doorway is an initialled datestone.	II
26 Middle Street; 54.01836°N 0.38968°W	—	Late 18th to early 19th century	The house is in light brown brick, with stone dressings, a dentilled brick eaves cornice, and a pantile roof. There are two storeys and one bay. The doorway is on the right, the windows are horizontally sliding sashes, and the ground floor openings are under wedge lintels.	II
Ivy House; 54.01980°N 0.39607°W		Early 19th century	The house is in red-brown brick with a pantile roof. There are two storeys and four bays, and a later wing on the left. The doorway has pilasters, and a shallow projecting cornice. The windows are sashes, those flanking the doorway with cambered lintels, the window to their left with a flat gauged brick arch, and the upper floor windows in architraves.	II
The Old Mill; 54.03095°N 0.38413°W		1829	The former windmill is in brown brick with a stepped brick eaves cornice. It consists of a circular tapering tower with three storeys. The openings, including the doorway, have segmental heads.	II
6 Driffield Road; 54.02110°N 0.39225°W	—	Early to mid-19th century	The house is in yellow-brown brick with a pantile roof. There are two storeys and three bays. The central doorway has pilasters, a semicircular fanlight, and a shallow cornice. The windows are sashes, on the ground floor with wedge lintels, and on the upper floor in architraves.	II
Churchyard wall 54.01644°N 0.39057°W	—	Early to mid-19th century	The wall runs along the north of the churchyard of All Saints' Church. It is in limestone on a red brick plinth, with quoins, a stepped brick band at the top, and has pantile copings. The wall contains three doorways with quoined surrounds and segmental heads.	II
Nafferton railway station and Station House; 54.01130°N 0.38637°W		1846	The station and stationmaster's house were designed by G. T. Andrews for the York and North Midland Railway. It is in brown and red brick on a plinth, with sandstone dressings, a moulded sill band, bracketed oversailing eaves, and a slate roof. There are two storeys and four bays, a left outshut, and a rear wing. On the front is a Tuscan portico with four antae on raised bases, and an entablature. On the front are two doorways with rectangular fanlights, and the windows are sashes under flat gauged brick arches, those on the ground floor in rectangular recesses.	II
Goods shed, Nafferton railway station 54.01084°N 0.38730°W		1846	The goods shed, which was built for the York and North Midland Railway, is in red brick, with stone dressings, overhanging eaves, and a hipped slate roof. On the east front is a low office, and to its right is a large round-arched engine opening with a sandstone impost band. The south front has double doors in a round-arched engine opening, with a continuous impost band forming sills to the flanking Diocletian windows. On the west is a three-bay weatherboarded extension on iron columns with ornate brackets.	II
