= Percival Levett =

English merchant

Percival Levett (1560–1625) was an early merchant and innkeeper of York, England, sheriff of the city, member of the Eastland Company and father of English explorer Capt. Christopher Levett.

Levett was born in Harewood, Yorkshire, and removed early to the city of York, where he was listed as a freeman in 1581, and where he served the city as chamberlain and subsequently Sheriff in 1597. His daughter Ann married another York Sheriff, Christopher Topham (father of Member of Parliament Christopher Topham), and on his death married Joseph Micklethwaite.

His ancestors came from Bolton Percy, Yorkshire, and they shared a coat-of-arms with the Levetts of Normanton, High Melton and Hooton Levitt, Yorkshire, indicating that a cadet branch of the family probably relocated to Bolton Percy during medieval times.

Levett was a contributor from York to the Queen's Loan in 1590. He was a member of the Eastland Company, an English company established in the sixteenth century in an attempt to wrest Baltic trade from the Hanseatic League.

Levett was buried at St. Martin's Micklegate in York on 13 February 1625. Levett had done well enough as a merchant to acquire the title of gentleman, a title he was born without, and sold his home in Coppergate, in central York, to Matthew Hutton, Archbishop of York. Levett had at least two sons, and his brother Richard Levett was a long-serving mayor of Doncaster, South Yorkshire.

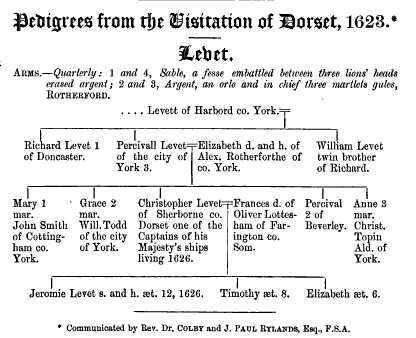
Ancestry of Percival Levett of York, Visitation of Dorset, 1623

== See also ==
- Christopher Levett
