= St Martin's Church, Lowthorpe =

Church in Lowthorpe, East Riding of Yorkshire, England

Coordinates: 54°01′55″N 0°21′14″W

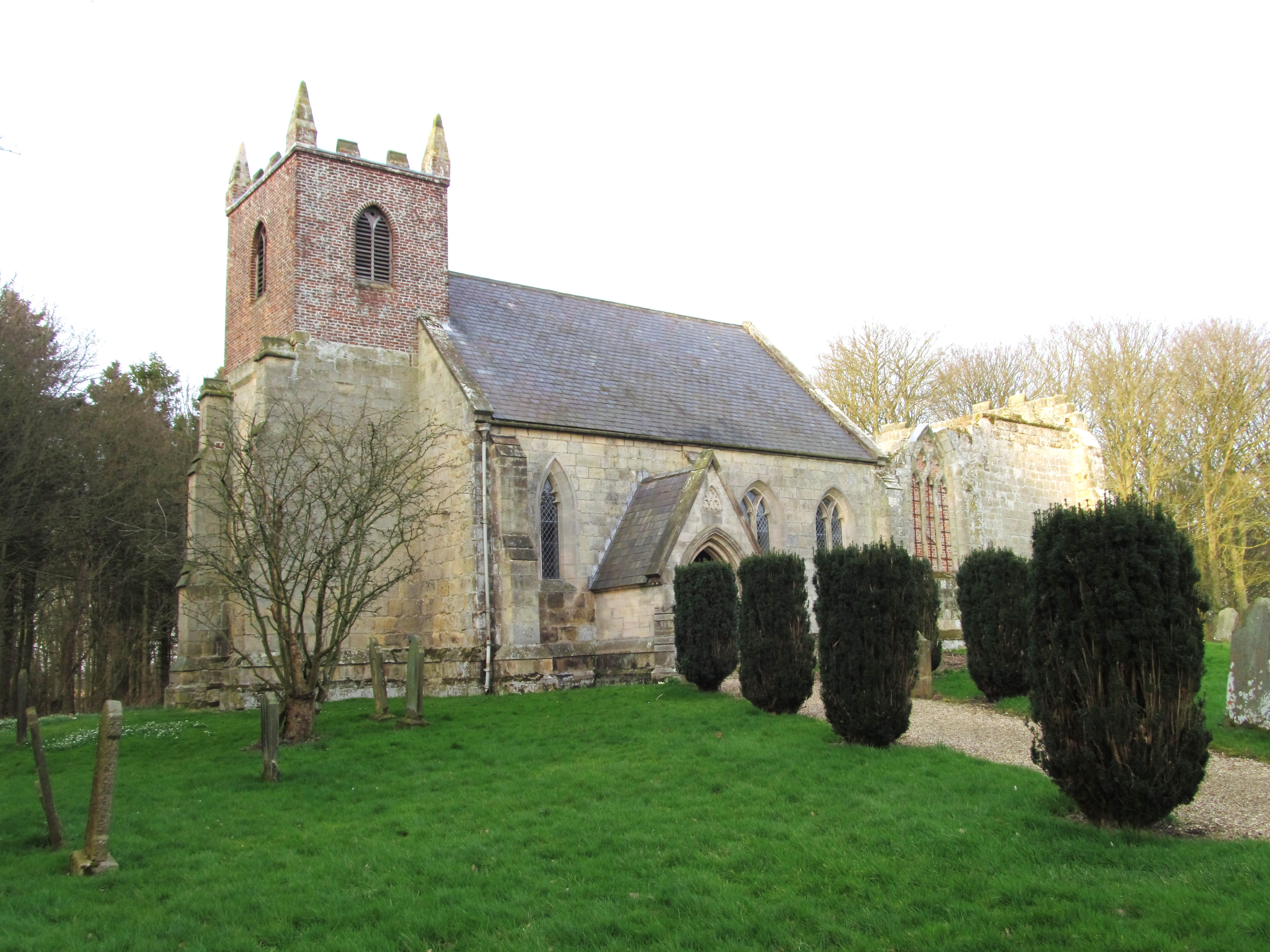
The church, in 2014

St Martin's Church is an Anglican church in Lowthorpe, a hamlet in the East Riding of Yorkshire, in England.

== History ==
There was a church in Lowthorpe before the Norman Conquest, which was made collegiate in 1333. In 1548, with the Dissolution of the Chantries, it was converted into a parish church. The oldest surviving parts of the church are 13th century, while the chancel dates from around 1333, and the tower is 15th century. In the 17th century the chancel was walled off, leaving just the nave in use. The tower was heightened in the 18th century, and in 1859 the nave was largely rebuilt and a porch was added. The church was grade II* listed in 1966, and in the late 1980s the chancel was consolidated as a ruin. Together with a standing cross, it is also a scheduled monument.

== Architecture ==
The church is built of sandstone and chalk, the upper part of the tower is in brick, and the roof is slate. It consists of a west tower and a nave with a south porch, and the chancel is in ruins. The tower has two stages, a double-chamfered plinth, buttresses, a two-light mullioned west window, pointed bell openings with Y-tracery, a stepped cornice, and an embattled parapet with corner obelisks. Inside there are several memorials and the head of a Saxon cross.

== Cross ==
In the churchyard is a cross, said to have been carved as the market cross of Kilham, East Riding of Yorkshire and to have been relocated to discourage people congregating at it during an outbreak of plague. It is 2 metres tall, and the head is 48 cm across. It consists of a sandstone pillar, tapering at the top, on which is a Maltese cross, with a fluted arris and a central rosette. It is also grade II* listed.

== See also ==
- Grade II* listed buildings in the East Riding of Yorkshire
- Listed buildings in Harpham
