= William Maister =

English politician (died 1716)

William Maister (after 1660 – 27 October 1716) was an English merchant and politician associated with the Whigs. He sat as MP for Kingston upon Hull from February 1701 till his death on 27 October 1716.

== Family and education ==
He was the first son of Henry Maister (died 1699) and Anne, the daughter of William Raikes. He married Lucy (died 1704), the daughter of John Rogers and widow of George Dickinson after February 1696. They had four sons and one daughter.

== Political career ==
In October 1699, he was chosen as Sheriff of Hull and praised as a man of "eminent loyalty to the government".

On 13 February 1703, he voted in favour of the Lords' amendments extending the time allowed for taking the oath of abjuration. On 28 November 1704, he opposed or abstained from voting on the "Tack". On 25 October 1705, he voted for the Court (Whig) candidate, John Smith for Speaker. In 1709, he is recorded as supporting the naturalization of the Palatines. On 9 February 1710, he served as a teller for a Whig motion intended to prevent a by-election in Cambridge. On 22 February 1710, he worked with Sir William St Quintin on a bill for improving poor relief in Hull and securing the release from quarantine of Baltic cargo belonging to Hull merchants.

In 1710, he voted for the impeachement of Dr Henry Sacheverell. On 7 December 1711, he supported the "No Peace without Spain" motion during debates over the War of the Spanish Succession. On 18 June 1713, he voted against the French commerce bill.

He died on 27 October 1716, leaving his estate to his eldest son Henry. His younger children each received £3000 upon turning 21.
