= Muston, North Yorkshire =

Village in North Yorkshire, England

Coordinates: 54.200°N 0.322°W

Muston
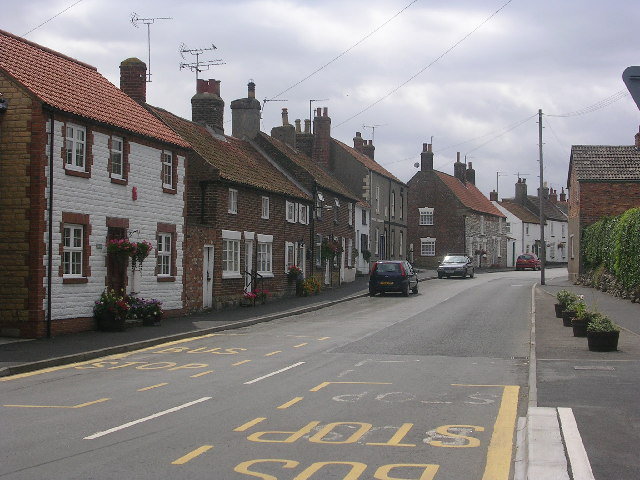
- Muston

- Location within North Yorkshire
- Population: 339 (2011 census)
- OS grid reference: TA096796
  - London: 185 mi (298 km) S
- Civil parish: Muston
- Unitary authority: North Yorkshire
- Ceremonial county: North Yorkshire
- Region: Yorkshire and the Humber
- Country: England
- Sovereign state: United Kingdom
- Post town: FILEY
- Postcode district: YO14
- Dialling code: 01723
- Police: North Yorkshire
- Fire: North Yorkshire
- Ambulance: Yorkshire
- UK Parliament: Thirsk and Malton

Muston is a village and civil parish, in North Yorkshire, England. It was historically in the East Riding of Yorkshire. The village is situated 1.5 miles (2.4 km) south-west from the centre of the coastal town of Filey, and on the A1039 road.

== History ==
According to the A Dictionary of British Place Names 'Muston' is derived from either the 12th-century "mouse infected farmstead", or a "farmstead of a man called Musi", being an Old Norse person name with the Old English 'tun' (farmstead or enclosure).

Muston is listed in the Domesday Book as "Mustone", in the Torbar Hundred of the East Riding of Yorkshire. The settlement included seven households, twenty-one villagers, six smallholders, and ten ploughlands. In 1066 Karli son of Karli held the Lordship, this transferring in 1086 to Gilbert of Ghent who also became Tenant-in-chief to King William I.

In 1823 Muston was a village and civil parish in the Wapentake of Dickering in the East Riding of Yorkshire. The ecclesiastical parish was a Vicarage held by the Archdeacon of Cleveland, Francis Wrangham. Population at the time was 350. Occupations included fourteen farmers, two butchers, two carpenters, three grocers, a tanner, a bricklayer, a corn miller, a shoemaker, an earthenware dealer, a tailor, a blacksmith, and the landlady of The Cross Keys public house. A daily coach linked Muston to Hull and Scarborough. A carrier operated between the village and Bridlington, Hunmanby and Filey twice weekly.

The 1863 parish church of All Saints' was designated a Grade II listed building in 1966.

There is a derelict windmill on the outskirts of the village, just off the A1039 road. References to a mill first appear in 1341. The current mill is thought to have been built in 1826 and was in use until 1932.

Muston became part of the Scarborough district of the shire county of North Yorkshire upon local government reorganisation in 1974. But in 2023 the district was abolished and North Yorkshire became a unitary authority.

== Community ==
According to the 2011 UK Census, Muston parish had a population of 339, an increase on the 2001 UK census figure of 325.

Muston is on the Yorkshire Wolds Way National Trail, a long-distance footpath.

Muston held an annual week-long scarecrow festival every summer, until 2018.

The village cricket team, Muston CC, plays in the Derwent Valley 'A' league.

== Gallery ==
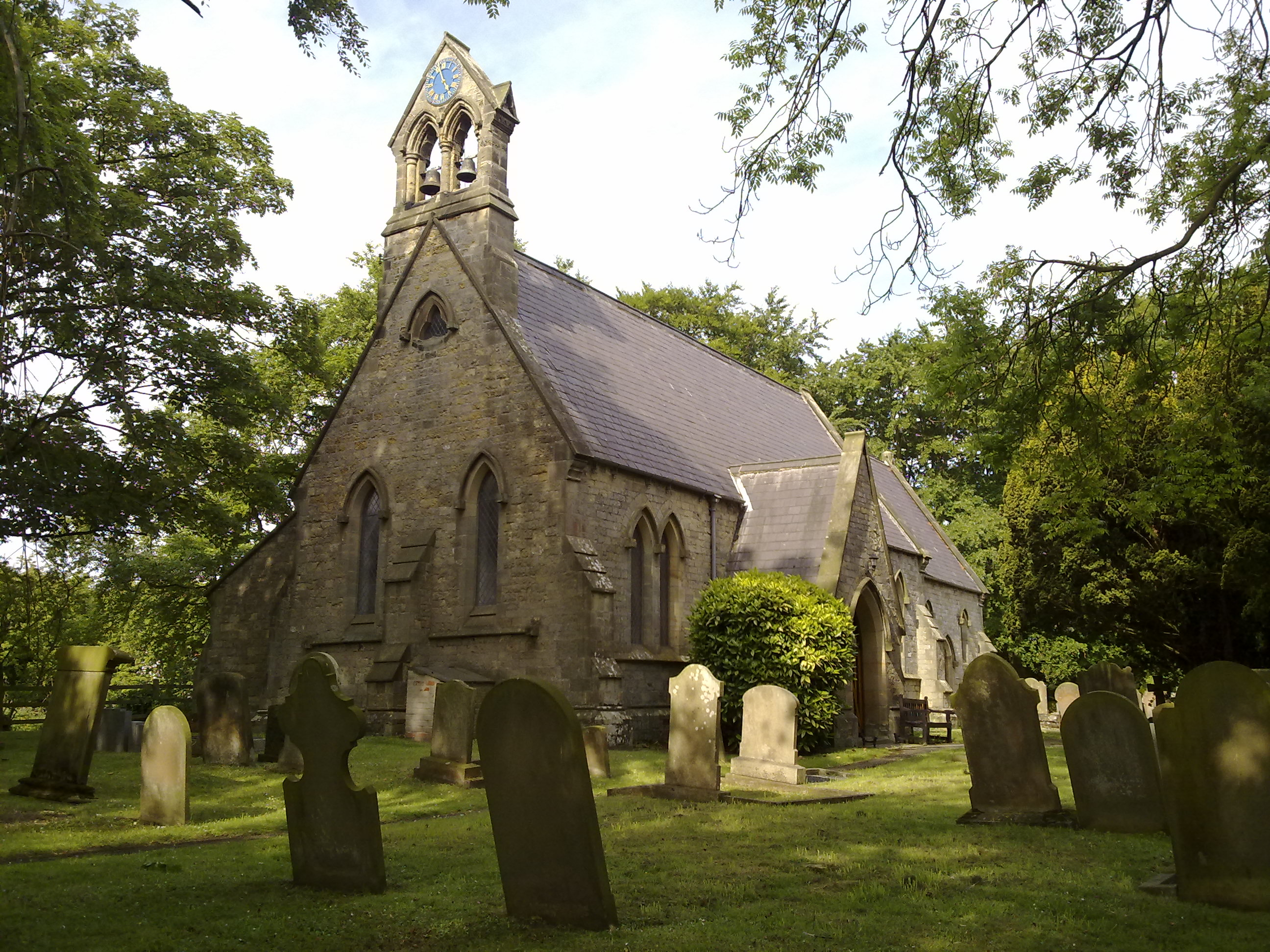
All Saints' Church, Muston

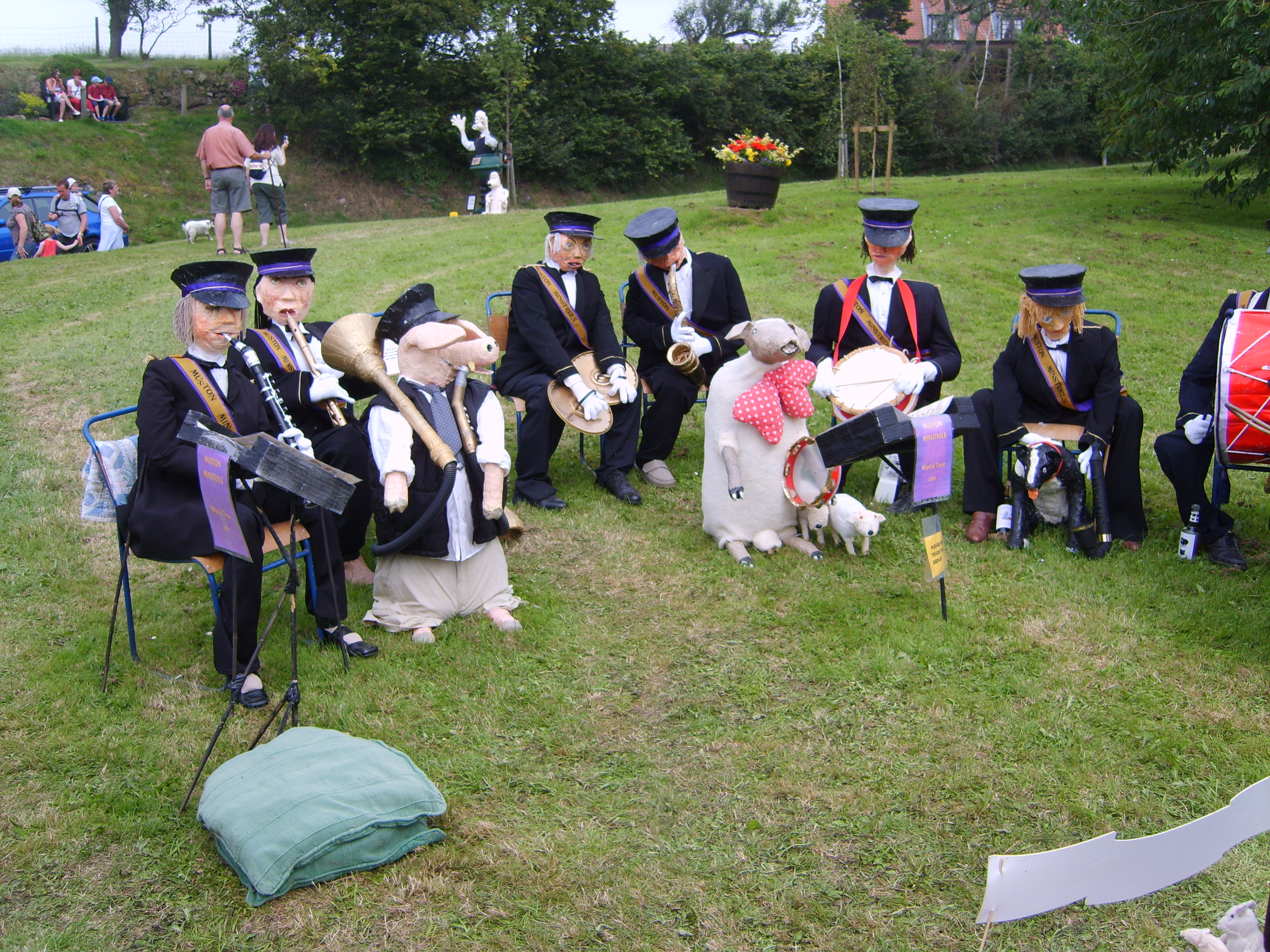
Scarecrow Festival 2008

== See also ==
- Listed buildings in Muston, North Yorkshire
