= Ruston Parva =

Hamlet in the East Riding of Yorkshire, England

Coordinates: 54°02′27″N 0°22′33″W

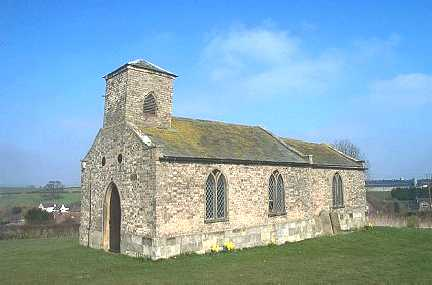
- St Nicholas's Church, Ruston Parva

- Location within the East Riding of Yorkshire
- OS grid reference: TA064617
- Civil parish: Harpham
- Unitary authority: East Riding of Yorkshire
- Ceremonial county: East Riding of Yorkshire
- Region: Yorkshire and the Humber
- Country: England
- Sovereign state: United Kingdom
- Post town: DRIFFIELD
- Postcode district: YO25
- Dialling code: 01377
- Police: Humberside
- Fire: Humberside
- Ambulance: Yorkshire
- UK Parliament: Bridlington and The Wolds

Ruston Parva is a hamlet and former civil parish, now in the parish of Harpham, in the East Riding of Yorkshire, England. It is situated approximately 8 miles (13 km) south-west of Bridlington and lies just north of the A614. In 1931 the parish had a population of 84. On 1 April 1935 the parish was abolished and merged with Harpham.

The name Ruston derives from either the Old Norse personal name Hror or the Old English personal name Roarr, and the Old English tūn meaning 'settlement'.

In the Domesday Book of 1086 the village is written as Roreston, and in 1066 and 1086 lordship of the manor was held by the Canons of the Church of St John, Beverley.

Evidence of medieval occupation has been recorded in the village though observations of earthworks, indicating ridge and furrow field systems, enclosures and a hollow way. In 1968 ditch remains of a moat were observed at the south of the village. The moat may have been part of Upper House manor house.

St Nicholas' Church, Ruston Parva is a Grade II* listed Anglican church. It was built in Norman style in 1832 from ashlar and yellow brick, and has a tower supported inside by cast iron pillars. Its two deck pulpit and box pews also probably date from 1832.

Leeds-based band the Kaiser Chiefs originally named themselves Runston Parva after the East Riding of Yorkshire village.

== See also ==
- Listed buildings in Harpham
