= St John of Beverley's Church, Salton =

Church in North Yorkshire, England

Coordinates: 54.2106°N 0.9030°W

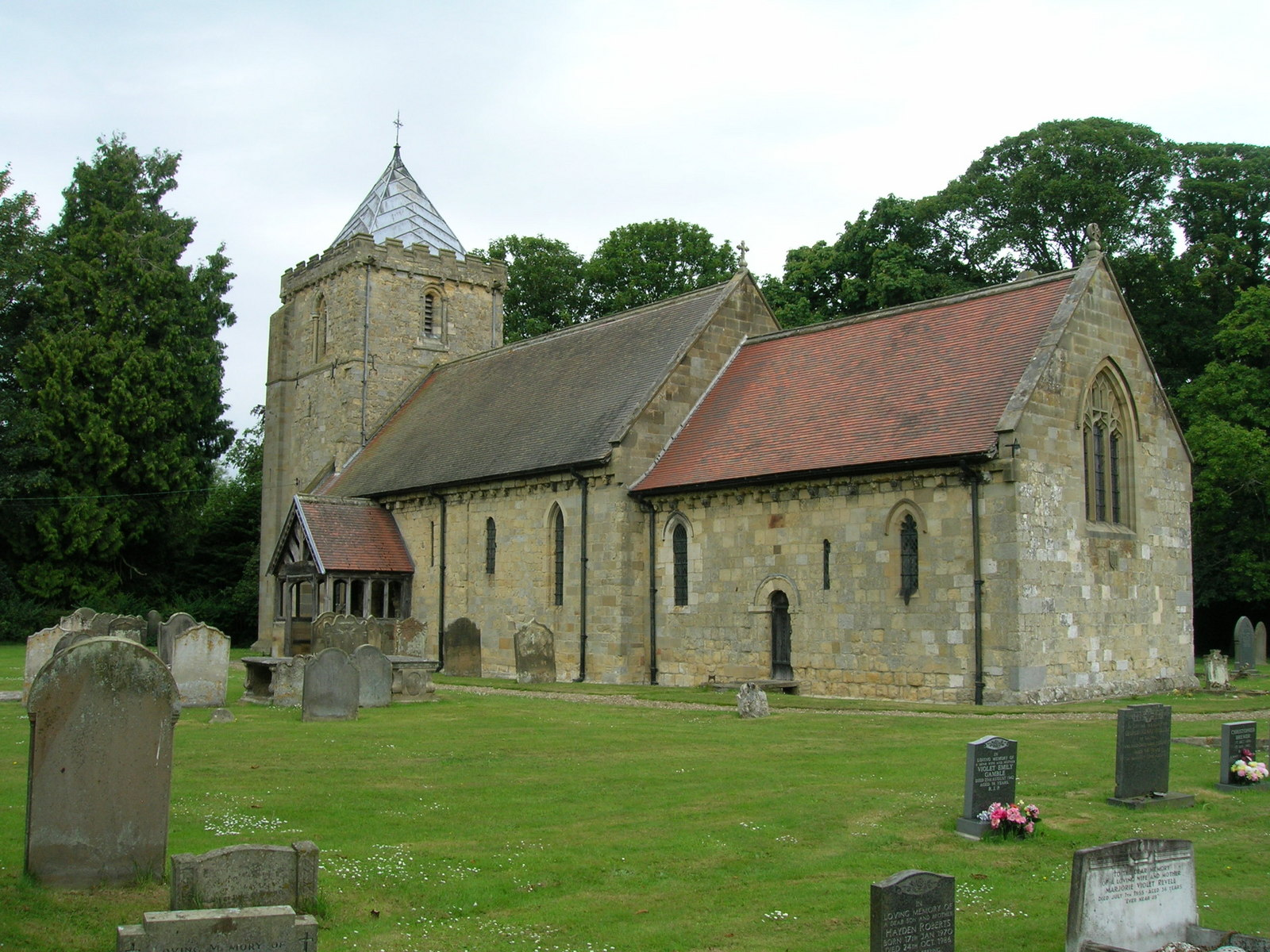
The church, in 2011

St John of Beverley's Church is the parish church of Salton, North Yorkshire, a village in England.

The church was built in the early 12th century. Late in the century, it was damaged by a Scottish raid, following which the north wall was rebuilt, and a tower was added. The tower arch dates to the early 13th century, when some of the windows were enlarged. In 1881, the building was restored by C. Hodgson Fowler, the work including rebuilding the east wall of the chancel. The building was grade I listed in 1955. In 2017, the roofs were restored, at a cost of £130,000.

The church is built of sandstone, with a lead roof to the tower, and tile roofs to the body of the church. It consists of a nave, a south porch, a chancel and a west tower. The tower has two stages, clasping buttresses, a three-light west window, lancet windows, a string course, louvred bell openings with round heads, a corbel table, an embattled parapet, and a pyramidal roof with a cross. The south porch has a round-arched doorway with two orders, and on the chancel is a round-arched priest's door with imposts. There are a variety of windows, including 12th-century lancets and larger 19th-century east and west windows. Inside, there is a 13th-century muniment chest with iron bindings and a 17th-century cover. There is also a 17th-century altar table, and the lectern and altar have 17th-century panels.

== See also ==
- Grade I listed buildings in North Yorkshire (district)
- Listed buildings in Salton, North Yorkshire
