= St John of Beverley's Church, Harpham =

Church in Harpham, East Riding of Yorkshire, England

Coordinates: 54°02′19″N 0°20′01″W

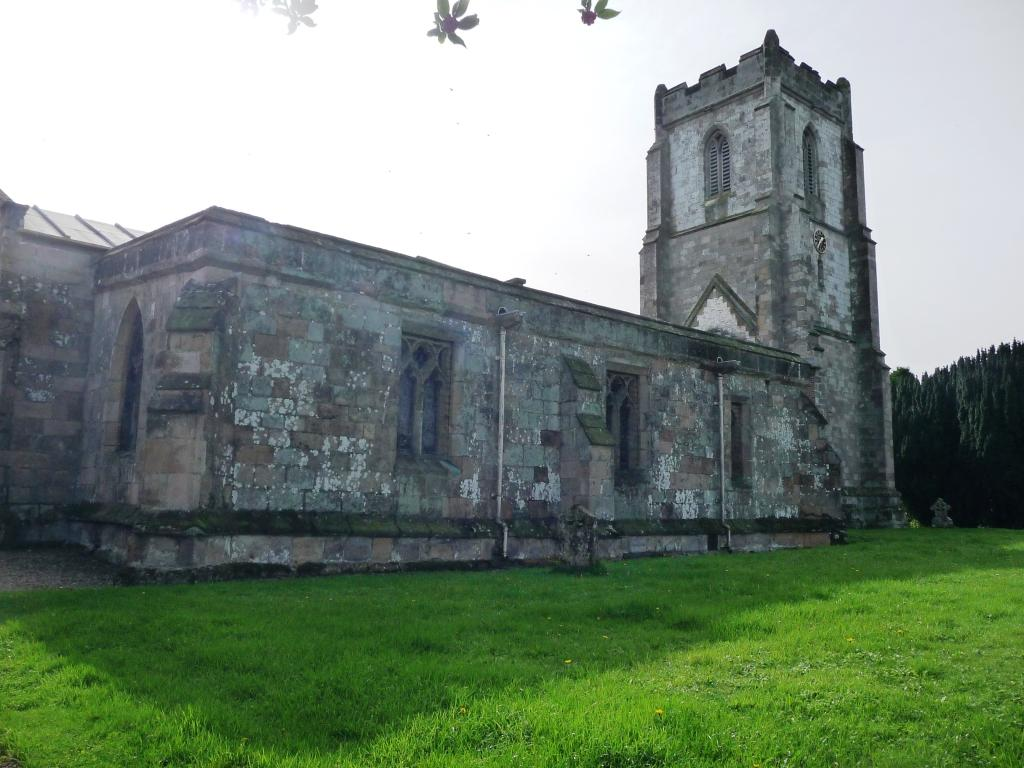
The church, in 2010

St John of Beverley's Church is the parish church of Harpham, a village in the East Riding of Yorkshire, in England.

The church was built in the 12th century, from which period the nave survives. The chancel was rebuilt in the early 14th century, and the tower was constructed later in the century. It was restored by Temple Moore between 1909 and 1914, whose work included a new east window. The building was grade I listed in 1966.

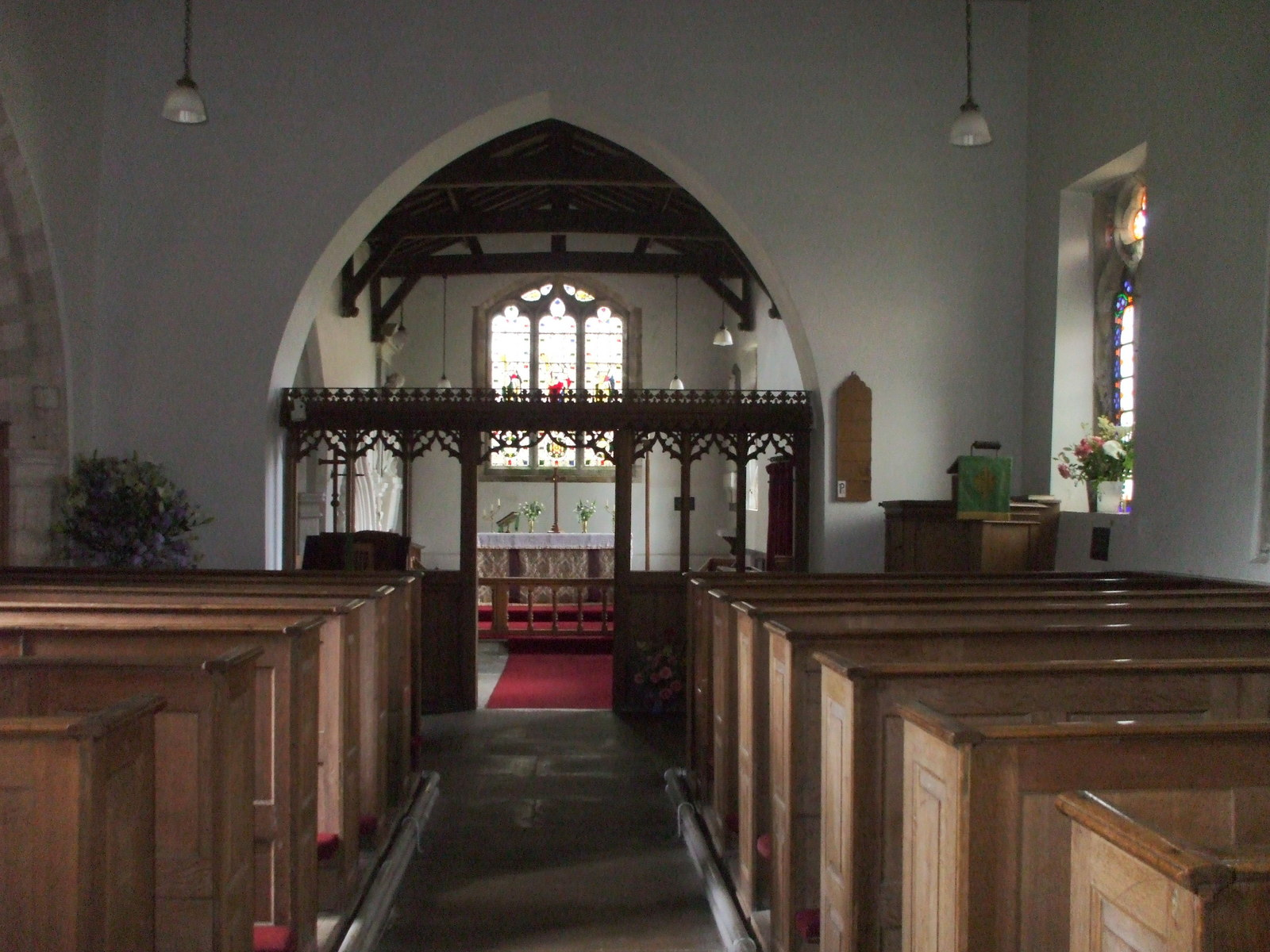
View from the nave into the chancel

The church is built of stone with some brickwork, and has lead roofs. It consists of a nave with a south porch, a chancel with a north chapel, and a west tower. The tower has three stages, a triple-chamfered plinth, angle buttresses, string courses, a pointed west window, and a small square headed window on the middle stage. The bell openings have Y-tracery, and above is an embattled parapet. Inside, the nave has a west gallery and there is an 18th-century pulpit. The church is best known for its memorials, including an alabaster effigy of William de St Quintin, who died in 1349, and his wife; and 14th- and 15th-century brasses. Several windows have stained glass designed by James Peckitt.

== See also ==
- Grade I listed buildings in the East Riding of Yorkshire
- Listed buildings in Harpham
