= St Quintin baronets =

Extinct baronetcy in the Baronetage of England

- Escutcheon of the St Quintin baronets of Harpham
- Creation date: 1642
- Status: extinct
- Extinction date: 1795
- Seat(s): Scampston Hall

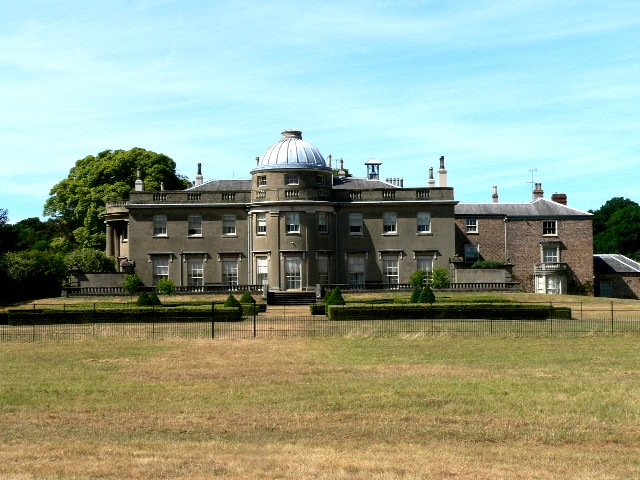
Scampston Hall, the seat of the St Quintin family

The St Quintin Baronetcy, of Harpham in the County of York, was a title in the baronetage of England. It was created on 8 March 1642 for William St Quintin. The third Baronet sat as Member of Parliament for Kingston upon Hull. The fourth Baronet was Member of Parliament for Thirsk. The title became extinct on the death of the fifth Baronet in 1795. The family estate of Scampston Hall was passed on to the late Baronet's nephew, William Thomas Darby, the son of Vice-Admiral George Darby, who assumed the surname and arms of St Quintin.

The family seat from the 1690s onwards was Scampston Hall, Scampston, Yorkshire.

== St Quintin baronets, of Harpham (1642) ==
- Sir William St Quintin, 1st Baronet (1579–1649)
- Sir Henry St Quintin, 2nd Baronet (c. 1605–1695)
- Sir William St Quintin, 3rd Baronet (c. 1662–1723)
- Sir William St Quintin, 4th Baronet (c. 1700–1770)
- Sir William St Quintin, 5th Baronet (1729–1795)
