= Christopher Topham =

Christopher Topham, member of Parliament for York (died 1670), was the son of York merchant and Sheriff for the city of York Christopher Topham and his wife Ann, a daughter of Percival Levett, merchant of York and also formerly a Sheriff for the city of York. Topham was married to Susan Micklethwait, daughter of Elias Micklethwait, York merchant and member of Parliament as well as twice the mayor of York.

Topham was elected an alderman for the city of York after the execution of King Charles I. Topham served as Sheriff for York in 1647, and in 1660 was Lord Mayor of York. He was elected to Parliament in 1659.

Parliament of England
Preceded by Alderman Geldart; Alderman Dickinson	Member of Parliament for York; 1659; With: Alderman Dickinson	Unknown
