= Baron Wotton =

Extinct barony in the Peerage of England

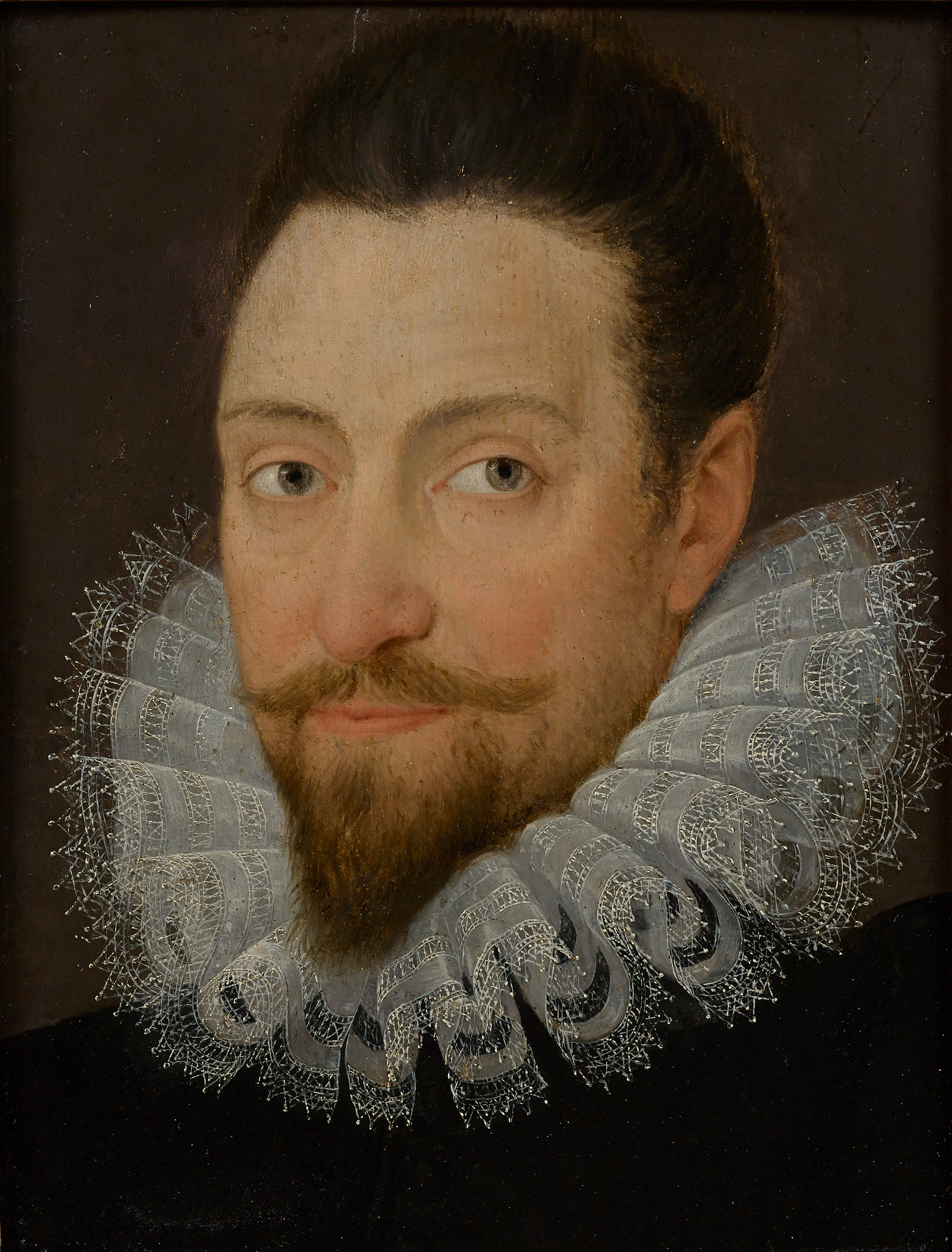

Baron Wotton was a title that was created twice in the Peerage of England. The first creation came in 1603 for Sir Edward Wotton, of Boughton Place, Boughton Malherbe, Kent, a descendant of Nicholas Wotton (d. 1448), twice Lord Mayor of London, who married Joan Corbye, heiress of Boughton Malherbe and settled at Boughton Place. Edward, in 1594 followed several of his forebears as High Sheriff of Kent and served as Ambassador to Queen Elizabeth I. After the death of his son and heir, the second Baron, in 1630, without male issue, the barony became extinct. His estate passed to his eldest daughter Katherine, who firstly married Henry Stanhope, Lord Stanhope. She was created Countess of Chesterfield for life on his death and later married Jehan van Kerkhoven. The title was revived for her son by her second husband, Charles Henry, who also created Earl of Bellomont in 1680. For more information on the second creation, which became extinct in 1683, see Earl of Bellomont.

== Barons Wotton; First creation (1603) ==
- Edward Wotton, 1st Baron Wotton (1548–1626)
- Thomas Wotton, 2nd Baron Wotton (1587–1630)

== Barons Wotton; Second creation (1650) ==
- see Earl of Bellomont

== See also ==
- Earl of Bellomont
- Katherine Stanhope, Countess of Chesterfield
- Henry Wotton
- Nicholas Wotton
