= Boughton Place =

Country house in Boughton Malherbe, Kent, England

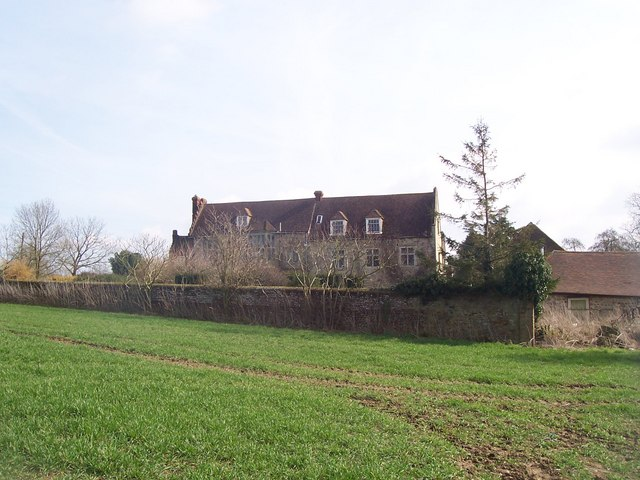
- West side of the house

- Location within Kent

General information
- Location: Boughton Malherbe, England
- Coordinates: 51.214844°N 0.693202°E
- Completed: 1520s

Boughton Place, formerly Bocton Place or Bocton Hall, is a country house in Boughton Malherbe, Kent, England. It is the historic home of the Wotton family and birthplace of Sir Henry Wotton (1568–1639), ambassador to Venice under James I.

== History ==
A fortified manor house was built on the site in the 1340s by Robert Corbie. Through the marriage of his grand daughter Joan to Nicholas Wotton, Lord Mayor of London in 1415 and 1430, the house became the property of the Wotton family. The Wottons retained ownership of the house until it passed into the Stanhope family in 1683 when it was willed by Charles Kirkhoven, 1st Baron Wotton to Charles Stanhope, younger son of his half brother Philip Stanhope, 2nd Earl of Chesterfield. Charles Stanhope changed his name to Wotton and on his death in 1704, the house passed to his elder brother Philip Stanhope, 3rd Earl of Chesterfield. The fourth earl sold the house in 1750 to Galfridus Mann, twin brother of Sir Horace Mann of nearby Linton Hall in Linton. On Galfridus Mann's death, it passed to his son Sir Horatio Mann MP, who also inherited his uncle's baronetcy and Linton Hall in 1786.

In 1771, Sir Horatio's sister Catherine married James Cornwallis. Cornwallis later became Bishop of Lichfield and Coventry and was briefly the 4th Earl Cornwallis. His son, James Mann, 5th Earl Cornwallis, inherited Boughton Place and it remained in the Cornwallis family until it was sold by Fiennes Cornwallis, 1st Baron Cornwallis to John Kitchin in 1922.

== Building ==
The house is the remaining part of a larger courtyard house, much of which has been demolished. The first part was constructed in the 1520s and was added to and enlarged in the 1550s and 1580s and alterations were made in the 19th and 20th centuries. It is a two-storey building aligned roughly north-south with an attic floor in the roof. It is built mostly of local rag-stone with a tiled roof and stone framed windows in a variety of sizes, but also has later sections constructed of red brick. The interior features some 16th-century moulded plaster ceilings, but historic timber panelling dating from the 1520s was removed from the house in 1923 and taken to the United States. (Note: The panelling was described in The Times of 4 December 1923 as being from a room 19 by 19 feet (5.8 m × 5.8 m) and 13 feet (4.0 m) high with 380 carved panels.)

The house is a Grade I listed building and an adjacent cottage and oast house are listed Grade II.

== See also ==
- Boughton Monchelsea Place in nearby Boughton Monchelsea
- Grade I listed buildings in Maidstone

Other owners or residents of Boughton Place:

- Nicholas Wotton (1497–1567)
- Edward Wotton, 1st Baron Wotton (1548–1628)
- Thomas Wotton, 2nd Baron Wotton (1587–1630)
- Henry Stanhope, Lord Stanhope (died 1634)
- Katherine Stanhope, Countess of Chesterfield (1609–67)
- Charles Wykeham Martin (1801–70)
- Fiennes Cornwallis (1831–67)
