= Thomas Wotton (sheriff) =

Thomas Wotton (1521–1587), was a sheriff of Kent, the son of Sir Edward Wotton and father of Edward Wotton, the 1st Baron Wotton. He was the brother of William Wotton. His aunt Margaret was married to Thomas Grey, 2nd Marquess of Dorset.

In December 1547 employed in conveying treasure to his father, Sir Edward Wotton, at Calais, and in 1551 succeeded to his estates, his father having procured two acts of parliament ‘disgavelling’ his lands in Kent. Edward VI had intended making him K.B., but after Mary's accession the council on 19 September 1553 wrote him a letter ‘discharging him from being knight of the Bath, whereunto he was once appointed and written unto’ (Acts P. C. 1552–4, p. 351). On 16 Jan. 1553–4 he was summoned before the council, and on 21 Jan. ‘for obstinate standing against matters of religion was committed to the Fleet, to remain there a close prisoner’ (ib. pp. 385, 389). Walton in his Life of Sir Henry Wotton (Reliquiæ Wottonianæ, 1685, sig. b4) declares that the council's action was due to Nicholas Wotton, who had twice dreamt that his nephew was in danger of participating in some dangerous enterprise, apparently Wyatt's rebellion, and secured his temporary imprisonment to save him from worse perils. The date of his release has not been ascertained; but on 23 Nov. 1558, six days after Elizabeth's accession, he was made sheriff of Kent. For nearly thirty years he was regularly included in the various commissions for the county, such as those for the peace, for taking musters, gaol delivery, examining into cases of piracy, and fortifying Dover. In July 1573 he entertained Queen Elizabeth at Boughton Malherbe, when he declined an offer of knighthood, and in 1578–9 again served as sheriff.

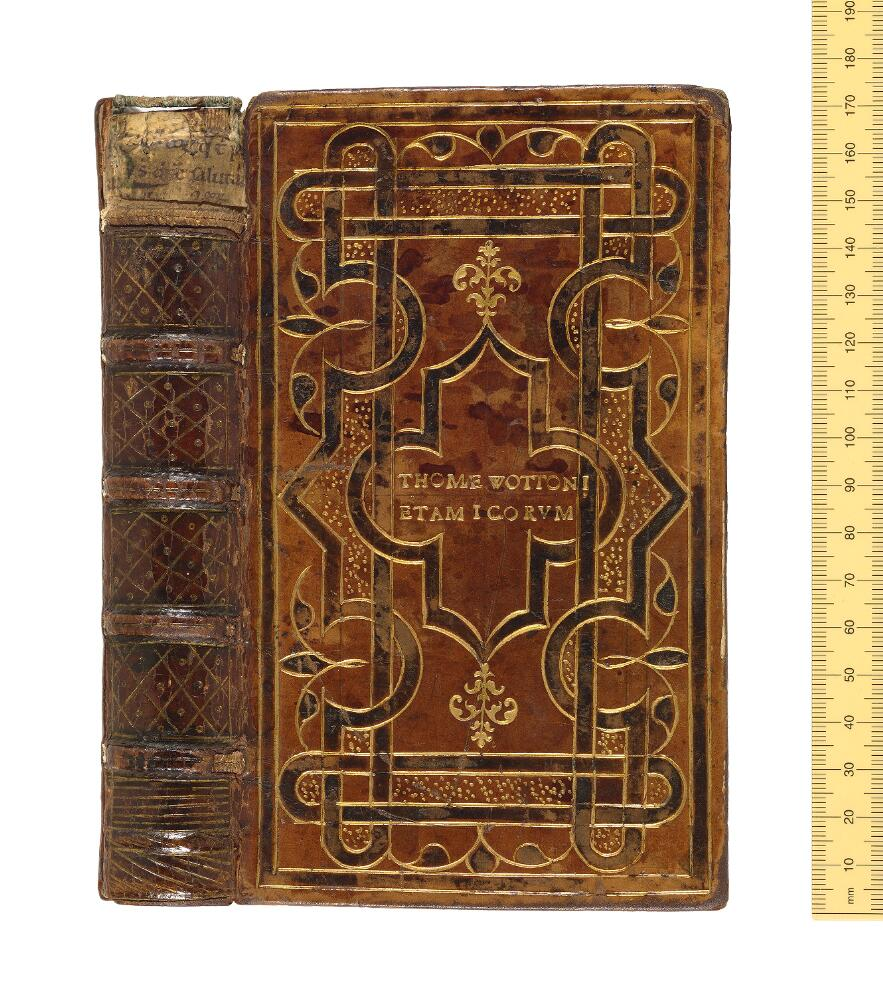
Book bound for Wotton's library. The strapwork design is similar to French bookbinding. Note the gilt supralibros 'Thomae Wotton et amicorum' (Thomas Wotton and his friends)

He was a person of ‘great learning, religion, and wealth,’ and a patron of learning and Protestantism in others. Thomas Becon dedicated to him his ‘Book of Matrimony,’ and Edward Dering his Sparing Restraint. William Lambarde also dedicated to Wotton in 1570 his Perambulation of Kent, which was published in 1576 with a prefatory letter by Wotton.

== Library ==
About 140 volumes from Wotton’s library are known. The bindings he commissioned are similar to French bindings of the time. Some sources such as sale catalogues suggest that the bindings were commissioned during putative visits by Wotton to Paris. However, following the researches of scholars such as Anthony Hobson, opinion has shifted towards the idea that Wotton's bindings were made in England. Thomas Berthelet, King’s Printer and Binder, employed several craftsmen who were either French or trained in French techniques

== Personal ==
The son of Sir Edward Wotton. He died on 11 Jan. 1586–7, and was buried at Boughton Malherbe (Inquisitio post mortem, Elizabeth, vol. ccxv. No. 263). He married

- First wife: Elizabeth, daughter of Sir John Rudston, by whom he had issue:

- Edward, first baron Wotton
- Robert Wotton;
- Sir John Wotton, who travelled widely, was knighted by Queen Elizabeth, and died young after giving some promise as a poet (cf. his two contributions to England's Helicon of 1600, ed. A. H. Bullen, 1899, pp. xviii, 65, 82)
- James Wotton (d. 1628), who served in Spain and was knighted on the field in 1596 near Cadiz
- Thomas Wotton

- Second wife: Eleanor, daughter of Sir William Finch and widow of Robert Morton, Wotton was father of:

- Sir Henry Wotton (1568–1639), the diplomatist and poet.
