= Nicholas Wotton (mayor) =

Member of the Parliament of England

Nicholas Wotton (or Wootton; d. 1448) was an English merchant and official who twice served as Lord Mayor of London, in 1415 and 1430.

== Family ==
Wotton was the son of William Wotton (d. 1391), a wealthy wool merchant, and his wife Margaret (d. 1404). His father may be the same William Wotton who was alderman of Dowgate Ward. He married Joane Corbie, only daughter and heiress of Robert Corbie. This marriage brought with it the estate of Boughton Malherbe, which would remain in the Wotton family for generations. After Joan's death in 1413, he remarried to a woman named Margaret.

== Career ==
Wotton was a member of the Drapers' Company. Like his father, he was a large investor in wool, with royal licenses to ship large quantities to Calais. His growing wealth enabled him to advance large loans to both Kings Henry IV and Henry V, in return for which he gained an exemption on customs duties until the loans were repaid.

Apart from his mercantile activities, Wotton held a number of political offices. He was at various times tax collector, Constable of the Staple of Westminster, and Mayor of the Staple of Westminster. He held the position of alderman for Broad Street Ward from 1404-1406 and Dowgate Ward from 1406 until 1446. He was one of the Sheriffs of the City of London in 1406-1407, Mayor of London in 1415 and 1430, and MP for London in the 1406, 1414, 1419, 1421, 1425, and 1429 parliaments.

While living in Kent, Wotton was summoned to be impanelled before the judges of assize. He refused to be sworn, asserting the privilege of former mayors and aldermen of London to not serve the king in any other part of the country without their consent. Though he was held in contempt, he received a royal pardon from Henry VI.

== Death and legacy ==
Wotton died in 1448, leaving his widow Margaret and two sons, Nicholas and Richard, and was buried in the church at Boughton Malherbe. As the younger son, Richard, was a clergyman, his inheritance ultimately reverted back to his brother's family. Among Wotton's descendants were the diplomat Nicholas Wotton, privy councilor Edward Wotton, MP Henry Wotton, Margaret Wotton, Marchioness of Dorset, and the Barons Wotton.
