= Edward Wotton =

Edward Wotton may refer to:

- Sir Edward Wotton (1489–1551) treasurer of Calais
- Edward Wotton (zoologist) (1492–1552), early English zoologist
- Edward Wotton, 1st Baron Wotton (1548–1628), English diplomat
