= Johannes Polyander =

Dutch theologian (1568–1646)

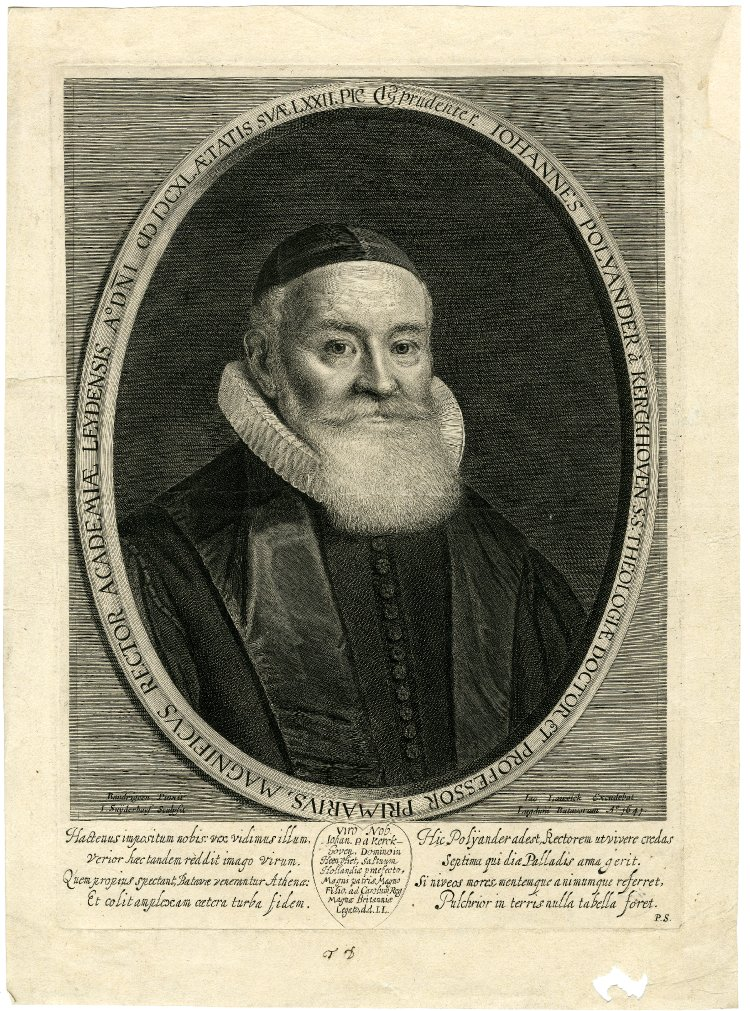
- 1641 engraving

Personal details
- Born: Johannes Polyander van den Kerckhoven; 28 March 1568; Metz, Kingdom of France
- Died: 4 February 1646 (aged 77); Leiden, Spanish Netherlands

Johannes Polyander van den Kerckhoven (28 March 1568, in Metz – 4 February 1646, in Leiden) was a Dutch Calvinist theologian, a Contra-Remonstrant but considered of moderate views.

== Life ==
He was born in Metz, France. His father was from Ghent, but had gone into exile in Lorraine where he was a Protestant pastor. The family then moved to Heidelberg. He studied at Heidelberg under Franciscus Junius, graduating M.A. in 1589; and then for a doctorate in Geneva in 1590, under Theodore Beza.

He became French preacher at Dordrecht in 1591, and later succeeded Franz Gomarus as professor of theology at the University of Leiden, where he taught from 1611. Polyander was considered a conciliatory figure, in the aftermath of the affairs at Leiden of Jacobus Arminius and Conrad Vorstius.

His epitaph is displayed in the Pieterskerk, Leiden.

== Family ==
His son was Johan Polyander, lord of Heenvliet. He was a Dutch diplomat. He married Katherine Wotton, Countess of Chesterfield. She was the widow of Henry Stanhope, Lord Stanhope.

== Works ==
He was invited by the States of Holland to revise the Dutch translation of the Bible (the Statenvertaling), and it was he who edited the canons of the synod of Dort (1618–1619). His published works include:

- Responsio ad sophismata A. Cocheletii doctoris surbonnistae (1610), against the Carmelite Anastasius Cochelet, an opponent of Justus Lipsius;
- Dispute contre l'adoration des reliques des Saints trespasses (1611);
- Explicatio somae prophetae (1625).
