= Lady Stanhope =

Lady Stanhope may refer to:

- The wives of the Earls Stanhope.
- The wives of the eldest sons of the Earls of Chesterfield.
  - Katherine Stanhope, Countess of Chesterfield (known as Lady Stanhope from her marriage to Henry Stanhope, Lord Stanhope).
- Lady Hester Stanhope
