= Edward Wotton, 1st Baron Wotton =

English diplomat and administrator

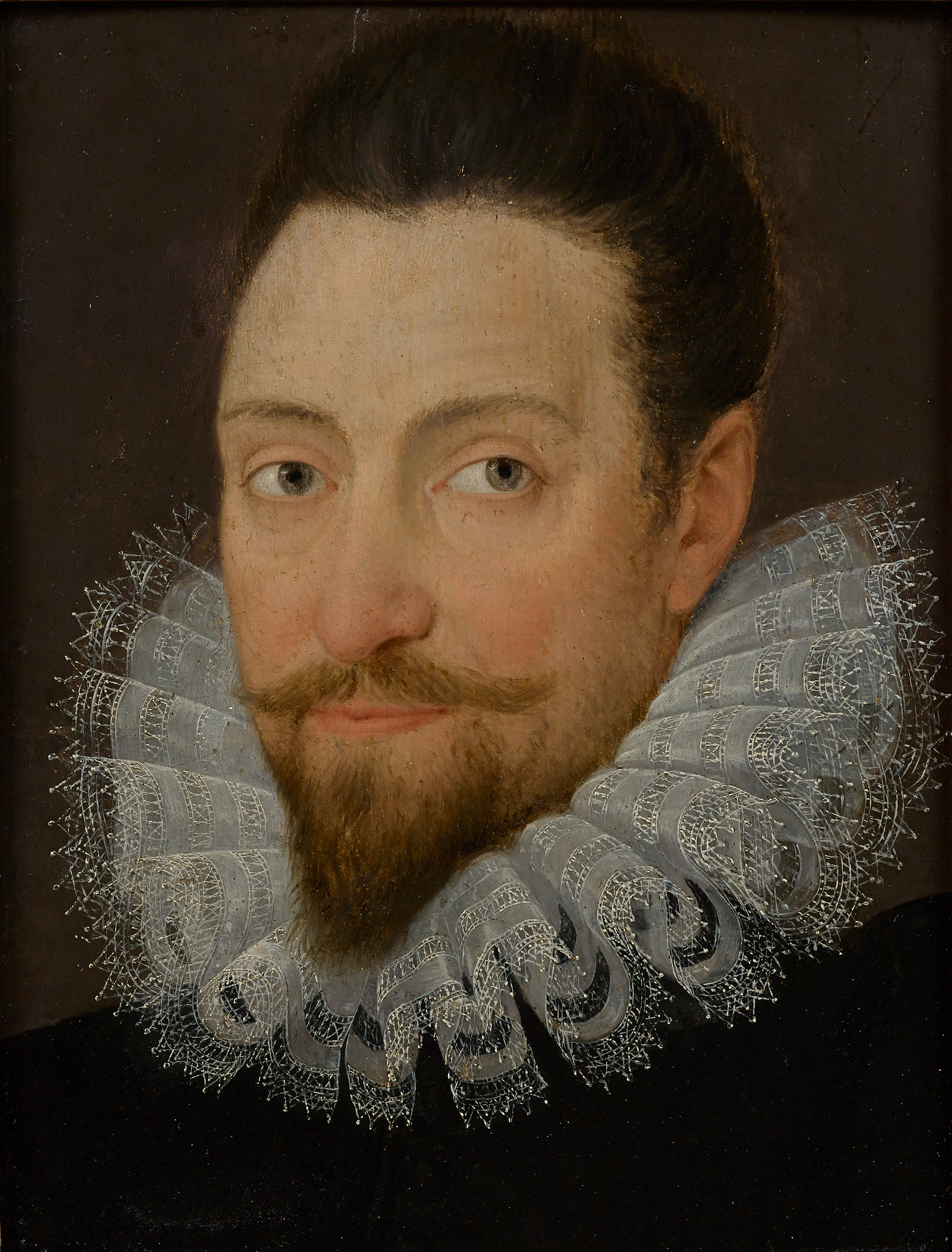
Edward Wotton, 1st Baron Wotton, late 16th century

Edward Wotton, 1st Baron Wotton (1548–1626) was an English diplomat and administrator. From 1612 to 1613, he served as a Lord of the Treasury. Wotton was Treasurer of the Household from 1616 to 1618, and also served as Lord Lieutenant of Kent from 1604 until 1620.

== Early life ==
Born in 1548, Edward was the eldest son of Thomas Wotton (1521–1587) by his first wife, Elizabeth, daughter of Sir John Rudston, Lord Mayor of London in 1528.

Edward does not appear to have been educated at any English university, but made up for the deficiency by long study on the continent. In 1579 Bernardino de Mendoza, the Spanish ambassador, stated that Wotton had spent three or four years among the Spanish residents at Naples and described him as "a man of great learning and knowledge of languages." He was certainly an accomplished French, Italian, and Spanish scholar; Mendoza also thought him "a creature of Walsingham's," but was unable to discover what his religion was.

The Scottish diplomat James Melville of Halhill recalled an incident in Edward's early career. Edward's grand uncle Dr Nicholas Wotton was an ambassador for Mary I of England in France, during the negotiation of the peace of Cateau Cambrésis. Dr Wotton was troubled by accusations that English soldiers served in the Spanish army. These allegations were made by the Constable of France, Anne de Montmorency. Melville says that he sent for his young grand nephew from England, who was about 19 years old, to learn French and Italian and serve as his secretary. Edward came to the French court anonymously as a simple countryman, Melville uses the Scots language word "landwart" (Landward) which means "countryside", accompanied only by his interpreter. According to Melville, Edward got an audience with the Constable and began to discuss the political discontent in England with Mary's husband, Philip II of Spain and Spanish influence in England. Edward was supposed to have spoken of a conspiracy to deliver Calais to France.

Naturally, the Constable was suspicious of the young man's offer, and Melville says he was asked if he knew anything of Wotton. Melville supplied his observation that he had seen Wotton deep in conversation with Dr Nicolas Wotton's secretary John Somers. Montmorency guessed that this was Dr Nicholas' plot to discredit him, and Edward remained a while in France, but now publicly known as the ambassador's grandnephew. Melville remembered the incident in 1585, when Edward was sent to Scotland by Francis Walsingham, and warned James VI that Edward might intend to deceive him.

== Career ==
He was early given diplomatic assignments by Walsingham, and in 1574-6 was secretary to the embassy at Vienna, Sir Philip Sidney being for a time associated with him in these duties. In May 1579 Wotton was sent to congratulate Henry, the new king of Portugal, on his accession, and on his way back had an audience with Philip II of Spain at Segovia. In January 1583-4 it was proposed to send him to Spain to protest against Mendoza's conduct in England and to explain his summary expulsion by Elizabeth. William Waad was, however, sent instead. On the following 9 Nov Wotton was returned to parliament as one of the Knights of the Shire for Kent.

=== Scotland in 1585 ===
In May 1585, Elizabeth, alarmed at the progress of the Catholic League in France and the success of Alexander Farnese, Duke of Parma in the Netherlands, selected Wotton as envoy to Scotland to persuade James VI to enter into an offensive and defensive alliance and to take the Dutch under his protection. He was also to suggest James's marriage to Anne of Denmark or Arabella Stewart, but it was not until six years later that the former scheme was adopted. Wotton received his instructions from his friend Sir Philip Sidney on 15 May, was at Berwick on the 26th, and was received by James VI at Edinburgh on the 30 May 1586. The Scottish court was dominated by James Stewart, Earl of Arran. Wotton's mission was to undermine him, as well as negotiate an Anglo-Scottish treaty.

There was plague in Edinburgh, and Wotton joined the king at Falkland Palace in the Fife countryside. Wotton brought James VI an offer of a regular payment or subsidy of 20,000 crowns, but was quickly advised by Francis Walsingham that the sum could only be £3,000 sterling. Walsingham gave him instructions and Wotton was to tell James that Elizabeth I was in favour of him marrying a Danish princess. Wotton discussed the proposals with James privately in a gallery at Falkland.

Assisted by Robert Zinzan alias Alexander, Wotton brought a gift of horses and hunting dogs which delighted the young king. James asked Zinzan to stay at Falkland for a while, but he returned to London with a report of Wotton's progress. A Danish embassy arrived in Scotland, and Walsingham wrote that it would good for Wotton to meet with them. Wotton's dealings with the Danish diplomats were described by James Melville of Halhill.

At first Wotton's success appeared complete; James agreed to the proposal for a league, and on 28 June 1585 the Parliament of Scotland approved. In the same month, however, the exiled Scots in England made a raid into Scotland, supported by an English force, and, though Elizabeth ordered the arrest of the offenders, James, with some reason, suspected the complicity of the English government and feared a repetition of the attempts to restore the exiled lords by force. Moreover, the Earl of Arran's influence over the king was still supreme, and Arran was strenuously supported by the French party.

Wotton found an ally in the Master of Gray, who proposed assassinating Arran. King James was disappointed when another gift of hunting hounds from England was late or delayed, and complications arose with the murder of Lord Russell (son of Francis Russell, 2nd Earl of Bedford) on 27 July 1585 at a day of truce at the border. Thomas Kerr of Fernihirst was involved in the incident, and charged to produce the offender. The Earl of Arran was implicated, and Elizabeth now sought to use the circumstance to ruin him. Wotton demanded his arrest and removal to England for trial, but James merely confined him at St Andrews Castle and then Kinneil House, whence he was soon released and resumed his ascendancy over James. Wotton's position was now precarious, and in August, Arran's ally, William Stewart of Houston openly insulted him in the king's presence. Elizabeth, however, hesitated to risk an open breach with James by effectively supporting her ambassador.

Henry III of France sent Michel Castelnau de Mauvissière to Scotland to reinforce French influence at Edinburgh, strengthening James in his refusal to give up Arran, and making Wotton's success hopeless. Wotton now advocated an incursion by the exiled lords, supported by an English force, and the seizure of James and Arran as the only means of restoring English prestige. But, aware of the danger to himself in such an event, he begged for his recall. This was granted on 11 October. Before Walsingham's letters could arrive Wotton slipped away in the night from the Scottish court at Stirling Castle and crossed the border, and on the 12 October he was at Berwick-upon-Tweed. (Note: full details of Wotton's negotiations are given in Cotton MSS. Calig. C. viii–ix) (Note: Add MS 32657, ii. 83–223) (Note: Joseph Bain, Hamilton Papers, vol. 2 (Edinburgh, 1892), pp. 643–708.) (Note: Border Papers, 1560–94, Nos. 335–876) (Note: Thorpe, Cal. Scottish State Papers, i. 495-5l2) (Note: Teulet, Papiers d'État, Bannatyne Club, ii. 728, iii. 404–6.)

=== France in 1586 ===
For some time after his return, Wotton was occupied in local administration in Kent. In November 1586, however, he was sent to France to explain to Henry III the intrigues against Elizabeth of Mary, Queen of Scots, certified transcripts of her letters in connection with the Babington Plot being sent him with directions on how to use them. (Note: Add MS 33256, ff. 172–205) (Note: Calendar Spain, Simancas, 1587–1603, p. 178.) (Note: his instructions dated 29 Sep in Cotton. MS. Calig. E. vi. 302) (Note: Bernard, Cat. MSS. Anglica, iii. 5270, f. 240))

=== Later career under Elizabeth ===
On 16 Feb 1586-7 he was one of the pallbearers at Sidney's funeral, and later in the year he succeeded his father at Boughton Malherbe, and on 5 January 1587-8 he was admitted student of Gray's Inn. In 1591 he was knighted, and in 1594-5 he served as High Sheriff of Kent. (Note: Add MS 33924, f. 16) In 1595-6 he vainly petitioned Burghley for the treasurership of the chamber, (Note: Lansdowne MS 79/19) and in March 1597 he was an unsuccessful candidate for the post of Lord Warden of the Cinque Ports. About the same time it was proposed to make him secretary of state, (Note: Collins, Letters and Mem. ii. 25, 27, 30,54) but, this failing, Wotton made strenuous but vain efforts to secure a peerage. In 1599, on an alarm of a Spanish invasion, he was appointed treasurer of a 'camp' to be formed, and in May 1601 he was offered but declined the post of ambassador in France. On 23 December 1602 he was made Comptroller of the Household and was sworn of the Privy Council. On 17 January 1603, John Chamberlain wrote: "The court has flourished more than ordinary this Christmas. The new comptroller has put new life into it by his example, being always freshly attired and for the most part all in white." On the following 19 February he was appointed to negotiate with Scaramelli, the Venetian ambassador.

=== Reign of James VI and I ===
James I retained Wotton in the office of comptroller, and on 13 March created him Baron Wotton of Marley, Co. Kent. (Note: Add MS 34218, f. 190b) In November he was one of the lords who tried Sir Walter Raleigh. (Note: Add MS 6177, f. 137) (Note: The Arraignment of Sr Walter Rawliegh . . . before Lord Wotton . . ., London, 1643, 4to) (Note: Edwards, Life of Raliegh)) During the early years of James I's reign Wotton was lord-lieutenant of Kent, (Note: Egerton MS 880, passim; Harley MS 6846, f. 42) but in August 1610 he was sent as ambassador extraordinary to France to congratulate Louis XIII on his accession. (Note: John Sherren Brewer, Court and Times of James I, i. 131) (Note: instructions in Stowe MS. 177, ff. 131-8)) On his return in October he brought Isaac Casaubon to England in his suite. (Note: Casaubonorum Epistoler, pp. 361–2) In June 1612 he was nominated commissioner of the treasury on Salisbury's death. In November 1616 he was made treasurer of the household, but on 23 December 1617 he was "persuaded" to retire from that office by the payment of five thousand pounds. This did not satisfy him, and he clung to office some weeks longer in the vain hope of extracting a viscountancy as a further compensation. He was excluded from the council on Charles I's accession on the grounds of being a Roman Catholic. (Note: Samuel Rawson Gardiner, v. 419) (Note: John Sherren Brewer, Court and Times of Charles I, i. 8))

Wotton retired to Boughton Malherbe, where he died early in 1626; the inquisitio post mortem was taken on 12 April. (Note: 6 Charles I, vol. iii. no. 92) Wotton's widow had inscribed on her husband's tomb:

To her beloved husband, Lord Edward Wotton,
Baron of Marley, a Catholic.
His grieving wife, Lady Margaret Wotton,
daughter of Lord Wharton of Wharton, a Catholic.

For this blatant admission of their religion, Lady Wotton was fined and ordered to remove the word "Catholic". Instances like this were rare.

== Role in Literary History ==
Wotton's half-brother, the diplomatist Sir Henry Wotton, was a poet, but Edward also played a role in the literary world, as a benefactor. He was named in the first line of his friend Sir Philip Sidney's "The defense of poesie" (1595):

"When the right virtuous Edward Wotton and I were at the Emperor's court together, we gave ourselves to learn horsemanship of John Pietro Pugliano, one that with great commendation had the place of an esquire in his stable; and he, according to the fertileness of the Italian wit, did not only afford us the demonstration of his practice, but sought to enrich our minds with the contemplations therein which he thought most precious."

He also engaged John Florio to undertake the first English translation of Michel de Montaigne's "Essais", published in 1603. In his preface, Florio referred to him as his "not-to-be-denied Benefactor (Noble and vertuous Sir Edward Wotton)".

George Chapman, in his 1608 translation of the Illiad, dedicated a sonnet to Edward: "To the right Noble, and (by the great eternizer of Virtue, Sir P. Sydney) long since eternized, Right Virtuous, the accomplished Lord Wotton. &c."

== Family ==
Edward had three younger brothers:

- James, knighted at Cádiz in 1596.
- John, who died as young adult
- A half-brother, Sir Henry Wotton, the son of Elionora Finch.

Wotton first married, on 1 September 1575, Hester, daughter of Sir William Puckering. She died on 8 May 1592 and was buried in Boughton Malherbe church. His second wife was Margaret, daughter of Philip Wharton, 3rd Baron Wharton, who lived until 1652. (Note: see Calendar of the Committee for Compounding, p. 2309; Add MS 5494, f. 197; and Lords' Journals, vii. 302, 388, viii. 254, 315, ix. 118) Wotton had issue by his first wife only, a son Thomas and a daughter Philippa, who married Sir Edmund Bacon.

Thomas succeeded as second baron, but, being of weak health and a Roman Catholic, took little part in politics. On 6 June 1608 he married Mary (1590–1658), daughter of Sir Arthur Throckmorton, with whom he had four daughters: Katherine, who inherited Boughton Malberbe and first married Henry Stanhope, Lord Stanhope, by whom she was mother of Philip Stanhope, 2nd Earl of Chesterfield; secondly, John Polyander à Kirkhoven; and, thirdly, Daniel O'Neill. His daughter Hester (d. 1649) was the third wife of Baptist Noel, third viscount Campden; his daughter Margaret married Sir John Tufton; Anne, his fourth daughter, married Sir Edward Hales, father of Sir Edward Hales, titular earl of Tenterden. He died, aged 43, on 2 April 1630 and was buried in Boughton Malherbe church; in February 1632-3 his widow was fined 500 pounds by the court of high commission for removing the font in the church to make room for her husband's tomb and for inscribing on it "a bold epitaph" stating that he died a Roman Catholic. (Note: Court and Times of Charles I, ii. 227) (Note: Laud, Works, v. 311)

Political offices
Preceded by ??	High Sheriff of Kent; 1594	Succeeded by Thomas Palmer
Preceded by William Knollys, 1st Earl of Banbury	Comptroller of the household 1602–1616	Succeeded by Sir Thomas Edmondes
Preceded by The Lord Cobham	Lord Lieutenant of Kent; 1604–1620	Succeeded by The Marquess of Buckingham
Preceded by Sir William Knollys	Treasurer of the Household; 1616–1618	Succeeded by Sir Thomas Edmondes
Peerage of England
New creation	Baron Wotton; 1603–1628	Succeeded by Thomas Wotton
