= Operation Big Ben =

British bombing missions against Germany during WW2

Operation Big Ben was the title given to the dive-bombing British Spitfire missions against German mobile V-2 rocket launch sites in Holland between October 1944 and April 1945, during World War II. The code word 'Big Ben' meant 'V2 Rocket' and was used by the Filter Room at Fighter Command and by the pilots of the mission; but the phrase 'Operation Big Ben' was not used in official documentation (none found since the release of former Top Secret papers from the National Archive from January 2004), even though pilots (such as Flt Lt Raymond Baxter, who went on to become the voice of the Farnborough Air Show and BBC TV's technology programme Tomorrow's World) identified the sorties under the name 'Operation Big Ben'.

== Description ==
The missions were specific: Spitfire Mark XVI's with clipped wings, flew in formations of four aircraft (some Mark IX and some Mark XIV were also used occasionally) and dive-bombed the sites, sometimes through breaks in heavy cloud. Each Spitfire carried a 250lb bomb under each wing and a 500lb bomb under the fuselage. Very occasionally, if they were pin-pointing locations further away, they would carry only the two 250lb bombs or the 500lb bomb in order to save on fuel.

Although the operation has been the subject of two extensive books, the extent of the success of the missions is still not known. It is considered successful because it is appreciated that the Spitfires did destroy some of the mobile V2 launch sites, along with bridges, roads and railway tracks, which were crucial supply lines; but the operation didn't completely stop the rocket attacks.

In interview about 'Operation Big Ben', Flt Lt Raymond Baxter said that it was the most difficult operation he ever took part in during the Second World War and insisted that unequivocally, the operation was called 'Operation Big Ben'.

Over the ten years since the operation has been appreciated by aviation historians, a short CGI film has documented the missions, a limited-edition model of Raymond Baxter's Mark XVI Spitfire was produced (which he signed the plinth of each model) and two respected non-fiction books have become available.
