= Henry Bishop (postmaster general) =

British postmaster general (1605–1691)

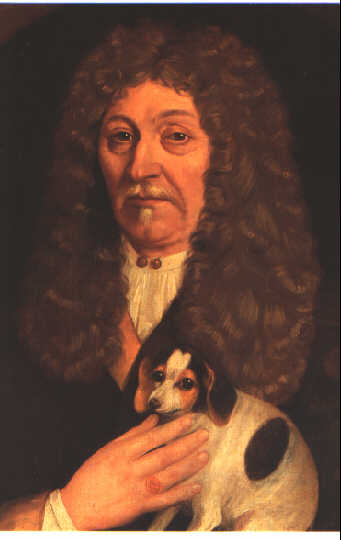
Henry Bishop

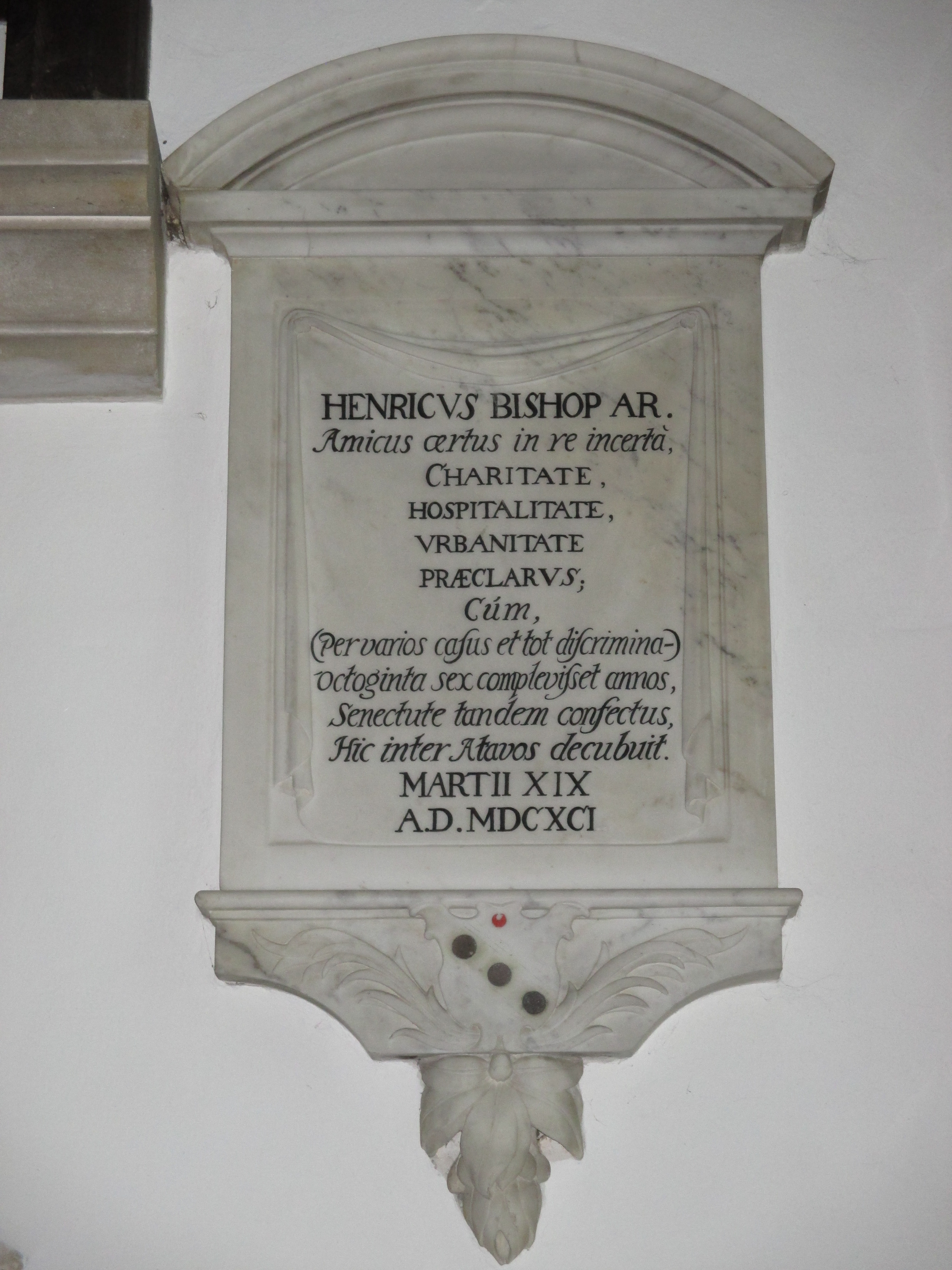
Memorial tablet to Henry Bishop in St Peter's Church, Henfield, West Sussex

Henry Bishopp (1605–1691), also spelt Bishop and Bisshopp, from Henfield in West Sussex, England was a Postmaster General of England and inventor of the first postmark used on mail. He was the second son of Sir Thomas Bishopp, 1st Baronet of Parham also in West Sussex. Henry at first fought for King Charles I, but was reconciled with parliament in 1647, after spending two years in Virginia. In the meantime his Rectory estate in Henfield had been sequestered. However, he was restored to royal favour in 1660 and served as postmaster-general between that date and 1663. At his death in 1692 (N.S.) his Rectory estate in Henfield passed to his great-nephew Sir Cecil Bishopp, 4th Baronet.

== Postmaster General ==
Before the creation of the position of Postmaster General, control of the post was in the hands of "Master of the King's Post". In 1660, at The Restoration, Henry Bishop paid £21,500 per year to farm the Post Office for a term of seven years. This was more than double the previous payment. Bishop's letters patent gave him the monopoly to carry letters within the kingdom. His appointment was to start on 25 June 1660, but was delayed until 29 September when the Act of Parliament reconstituted the General Post Office. Bishop claimed no less than £500 in compensation for the loss of income because several independent posts had been started between London and the country but were not suppressed until the act was passed; they infringed on his monopoly to carry letters.

Bishop was the first officially appointed Postmaster General to Charles II but within a year of taking office he was accused of abuses. In reply, he mentions the improvements he instigated including the stamping of letters, on 2 August 1661. He served in the position until April 1663 at which time he gave up the remainder of his lease to Daniel O'Neill.

== Bishop mark ==
Bishop Mark

Henry Bishop introduced the world's first known postmark in London in 1661. The "Bishop Mark" was designed to show the date on which a letter was received by the post and to ensure that the dispatch of letters would not be delayed. These were the world's first handstruck postage stamps

Bishop announced,

A stamp is invented that is putt upon every letter shewing the day of the moneth that every letter comes to the office, so that no Letter Carryer may dare detayne a letter from post to post; which before was usual.

The postmarks were usually on the back of the letter and are known initially used in the Chief Office in London but were introduced later in Dublin, Edinburgh and New York City.

The original London Bishop Mark, first used 19 April 1661 The earliest known examples of use are in the Public Records Office, Kew, West London, consisted of a small circle of 13 mm diameter, bisected horizontally, with the month (in serifed lettering) abbreviated to two letters, in the upper half and the day of the month in the lower half. Similar marks were used later in Scotland and Ireland, as well as the North American colonies.

In 1673, a new mark was brought into use which had a diameter of between 13 and 14 mm. The type used from this point was sans-serif and this continued in use until 1713. In 1713, larger handstamps were introduced which ranged in size from 14 to 20 mm. The layout of these was also changed, with the month appearing at the base. This type remained in use until 1787, when it was replaced by the double circle type.

Political offices
New creation	Postmaster General; 1660–1663	Succeeded by Daniel O'Neill
