= Raymond Baxter =

English television presenter (1922–2006)

Raymond Baxter OBE
- Baxter with a Jaguar aircraft in 1976
- Born: Raymond Frederic Baxter; 25 January 1922; Ilford, Essex, England
- Died: 15 September 2006 (aged 84); Reading, Berkshire, England
- Occupations: television presenter Commentator writer
- Employer: BBC Television (1950–2006)
- Known for: Tomorrow's World

Raymond Frederic Baxter OBE (25 January 1922 – 15 September 2006) was an English television presenter, commentator and writer. He is best known for being the first presenter of the BBC Television science programme Tomorrow's World, continuing for 12 years, from 1965 to 1977. He also provided radio commentary at the coronation of Queen Elizabeth II, the funerals of King George VI, Winston Churchill and Lord Mountbatten of Burma, and the first flight of Concorde.

== Early life ==
Baxter was born in Ilford in Essex. His father was a science teacher. He was educated at Ilford County High School, a grammar school for boys, from which he was expelled after being caught smoking. He did not go on to a college or university. Baxter worked for a brief period at the Metropolitan Water Board.

== RAF career ==
In August 1940, during World War II, he joined the Royal Air Force and trained as a fighter pilot in Canada. He first flew Supermarine Spitfires with No. 65 Squadron RAF in Britain, based in Scotland. He joined No. 93 Squadron RAF, flying over Sicily in 1943, where he was mentioned in dispatches. He returned to England in 1944 as an instructor and was later a flight commander, returning to active service with No. 602 Squadron RAF in September 1944.

On 18 March 1945, Baxter took part in a daylight raid on the Shell-Mex building in The Hague, which was then the German headquarters for V-1 and V-2 rocket attacks on southern England. The commander of the raid, Max Sutherland, received a bar to his DFC and Baxter, along with the three other pilots, was again mentioned in dispatches.

In an interview about his wartime career, Baxter described flying over a V-2 site during a launch on 14 February 1945, and his wingman firing on the missile: "I dread to think what would have happened if he'd hit the thing!"

He later flew North American Mustang and Douglas Dakota aircraft for a year, then worked in Forces Broadcasting Service (FBS) from 1945 to 1949, based in Cairo and then Hamburg, becoming its deputy director. He was demobbed in 1946 as a flight lieutenant.

== BBC career ==
Baxter joined the BBC in 1950. He provided radio commentary on the funerals of King George VI in 1952 and Winston Churchill in 1965, the former commentary given while suspended from the ceiling of Westminster Abbey. He also reported at the coronation of Queen Elizabeth II in 1953, reporting from Trafalgar Square.

Baxter was an accomplished rally driver and competed in the Monte Carlo Rally twelve times, six of them as a member of the BMC Works Team. He also competed in numerous Alpine, Tulip and RAC Rallies, which was satirised in the character Roland Thraxter in Peter Ustinov's Grand Prix du Rock. He was a crew member in the New Zealand Air Race in 1953, in a British European Airways Vickers Viscount.

Having an authoritative voice, he frequently commentated on motoring and aviation events. He was the BBC's motoring correspondent from 1950 to 1966, including at least twenty Formula One races, the Le Mans 24-hour race, and the Monte Carlo Rally. To parody this, he was invited to appear in an episode of Hancock's Half Hour when Hancock entered the rally, and onto I'm Sorry I Haven't A Clue to commentate on sessions of Mornington Crescent. In 1960, he narrated the Look at Life series, and a short film, Against the Clock, about the RAC Limited's 2,000-mile UK rally.

From 1967 to 1968, he was briefly Director of Motoring Publicity for the British Motor Corporation, while still presenting for the BBC. Following BMC's takeover by Leyland Motors, it was decided to dispense with Baxter's services in this post, and he returned to work full-time for the BBC. He presented the BBC's coverage of Farnborough Airshows from 1950 to 1986. He reported on the first flight of Concorde and was the first reporter to broadcast from an aeroplane, ocean liner and underwater. For thirty years, he was the regular commentator at the Royal British Legion's annual Festival of Remembrance at the Albert Hall and at the Royal Tournament. He presented the opening ceremony of the 1960 Summer Olympics, deputising for an indisposed Richard Dimbleby.

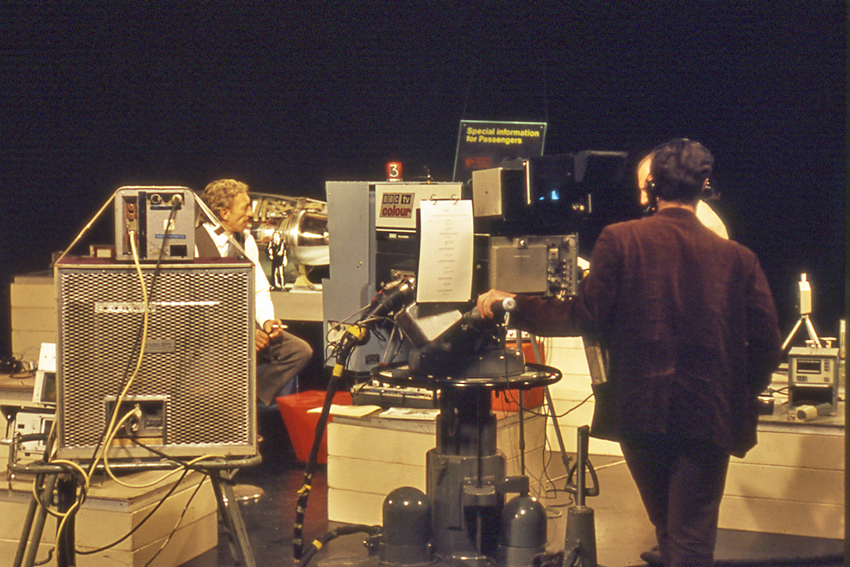
Raymond Baxter on the set of Tomorrow's World in TC7

He presented the science series Eye on Research from 1959 to 1963, and was the first (and initially sole) host of the long-running popular science show Tomorrow's World for 12 years from July 1965, reaching an audience of up to 10 million viewers. He was the presenter of the first live transatlantic broadcast from the US via Telstar in 1962, the first live telecast from Australia in November 1966, and interviewed South African surgeon Christiaan Barnard by telephone in 1967, within hours of the completion of the world's first heart transplant operation. Baxter also undertook commercial commissions. He was the presenter for the launch of Gillette's G2 Razors held at the Heathrow Hotel, London, in 1973. He left the Tomorrow's World programme in 1977, after disagreements with its new editor, Michael Blakstad, who described Baxter as "the last of the dinosaurs", while Baxter reputedly said he could not work with someone who arrived at the BBC each day on a bicycle.

== Other activities ==
In 1975 Baxter narrated The Hammond Organ 40th Anniversary Album, issued by Ad-Rhythm Records. Baxter also narrated The Story of Rolls-Royce, a 1988 film about the history of the world's most prestigious motor car, made by the Rolls-Royce Enthusiasts' Club. He also presented and narrated two fire safety training films in the 1970s.

Baxter was made an Honorary Freeman of the City of London in 1978 and awarded the OBE in 2003. He was a member of the Committee of Management of the Royal National Lifeboat Institution from 1979 to 1997, and Vice-President from 1987 to 1997. He became a Life Vice-President in 1997.

In 1998 he was the subject of This Is Your Life when he was surprised by Michael Aspel with the help of Stirling Moss, at a Soho recording studio.

Baxter was a founder member of the Association of Dunkirk Little Ships – he owned one of the small vessels that evacuated British troops from the beaches – and its Honorary Admiral from 1982, and Honorary Chairman of the Royal Aeronautical Society from 1991. He was on the Council of the Air League from 1980 to 1985.

== Personal life ==
Baxter married his American wife, Sylvia Kathryn Johnson, in 1945. They had a son, Graham, and a daughter, Jenny who is a fencing coach. Sylvia died in 1996. Baxter died on 15 September 2006 at the age of 84 at the Royal Berkshire Hospital in Reading, close to his home in Henley-on-Thames. In a statement his family said: "He had a love of innovation and challenge both professionally and personally."

== Filmography ==
- Mask of Dust (1955) – Himself
- The Fast Lady (1962) – Himself
- Grand Prix (1966) – BBC interviewer (uncredited)

== Books ==
- Baxter, Raymond; James Burke (1970). Tomorrow's World. London: British Broadcasting Corporation. ISBN 978-0-563-10162-8.
- Baxter, Raymond; Tony Dron (2005). Tales of My Time. London: Grub Street Publishing. ISBN 1-904943-32-2. (autobiography)
