= Sir Edward Wotton =

Sir Edward Wotton (1489–1551) was the English Treasurer of Calais and a privy councillor to King Edward VI.

== Life ==
Edward first appears in the commission of the peace for Kent on 2 June 1524; subsequently his name was generally included in the commissions of the peace, of gaol delivery, and oyer and terminer for the county. He was knighted before 22 April 1528, and on 9 November 1529 was appointed sheriff of Kent. He accompanied Henry VIII to Calais in 1532, landing on 11 Oct., officiated at the coronation of Anne Boleyn in 1534, and at the christening of Edward VI in 1537. He was again sheriff of Kent in 1535–6, and in December 1539 was one of the knights sent to Calais to receive Anne of Cleves.

Wotton seems to have eagerly adopted the principles of the Reformation, and in September 1538 a correspondent told Heinrich Bullinger that Wotton had received one of the reformer's books "with the greatest satisfaction, and is diligently engaged upon it." In July 1540 Henry VIII intimated his intention of reviving the office of treasurer of Calais, and appointing to it his trusty "councillor" Sir Edward Wotton, whose patent was dated 24 Nov. following. The phrase does not necessarily imply that Wotton was a member of the English privy council, and he is not recorded as attending any of its meetings during Henry's reign. After the conclusion of the war with France he served on the various commissions appointed in 1548 for delimiting Henry's conquest, the Boulonnais. According to Raphael Holinshed, Henry VIII made Wotton lord chancellor; the offer, improbable in any case, is more likely to have been made to Sir Edward's brother Nicholas.

Henry VIII nominated Wotton one of his executors and a privy councillor to his son Edward, though Wotton's official superior at Calais, Lord Cobham, was neither. Wotton remained a privy councillor when Somerset reconstructed the council in March 1546–7, but his duties at Calais prevented his frequent attendance at the council board. In April he was again made a commissioner to settle the disputes as to the frontier of the Boulonnais, and the growing hostility of France kept him busy with preparations for defence. On 13 March 1547–8, however, he signed the council's letter ordering the administration of the sacrament in one kind only, and on 17 January 1548-9 joined in proceedings against Thomas Seymour, 1st Baron Seymour of Sudeley. In September following he again came over to take part in Warwick's scheme for overthrowing Somerset. He was lodging in Warwick Lane, Holborn, on the 18th, he signed the council's manifesto against the Protector on 6 October, and accompanied the other councillors to Windsor six days later, when Somerset was arrested. In November he appears to have returned to Calais, but a year later he was again in attendance at the council. Hasted states that be died on 8 November 1550, but he attended the council on the 22nd of that month, and in January 1550-1 was suppressing disorder in Kent. In the same year also he was included in various commissions among which the young king proposed to divide the work of the privy council. Apparently it was on 8 November 1561 that he died. He was buried in Boughton Malherbe church.

== Personal ==
Wotton was born in 1489. He was the eldest son of Sir Robert Wotton, by his wife Anne, daughter of Sir Henry Belknap. Sir Robert was grandson of Nicholas Wotton (1372–1448), who was sheriff in 1400 and lord mayor in 1415, and again in 1430, and represented the city in parliament continuously from 1406 to 1429.

Nicholas Wotton acquired the manor of Boughton Malherbe, Kent, by his marriage with Joan, only daughter and heir of Robert Corbie of that place, and was succeeded by his son also named Nicholas, who died on 9 April 1481. The latter's son, Sir Robert was born in 1465, was knighted by Edward IV, served as Sheriff of Kent in 1498–9, was made lieutenant of Guianes, and from 1510 to 1519 was knight-porter of Calais. Sir Robert married Anne, daughter of Sir Henry Belknap, grandson of Sir Robert de Bealknap of Knelle in the parish of Beckley, Sussex, Chief Justice of the Common Pleas in his era. And by her he left two sons, Edward Wotton and Dr. Nicholas Wotton, and three daughters. Edward's sister Margaret was the second wife of Thomas Grey, 2nd Marquess of Dorset.

Sir Edward Wotton married, first, Dorothy, fourth daughter of Sir Robert Rede (she died on 8 Sept. 1529); and he married, secondly, Ursula, daughter of Sir Robert Dymoke and widow of Sir John Rudston, lord mayor of London. By her Wotton had no children, but by his first wife he was father of Thomas Wotton (1521–1587) who married his step-sister Elizabeth Rudston, William Wotton (by 1532 – 1556) and Anne Wotton, who married firstly James Cromer and had William Cromer and secondly her step-brother Robert Rudston of Boughton Monchelsea.
