= Postmaster General of the United Kingdom =

Former cabinet position in the British government

- Royal Arms as used by Her Majesty's Government; General Post Office

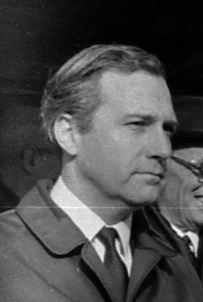
- Last in office John Stonehouse; 1 July 1968 – 1 October 1969
- Style: Postmaster General
- Appointer: Monarch of the United Kingdom on advice of the Prime Minister
- Precursor: Master of the King's Post
- Formation: 1517
- First holder: Brian Tuke (as Master of the King's Post)
- Final holder: John Stonehouse
- Abolished: 1 October 1969
- Succession: Overseen by the following: Department of Trade and Industry (1974–2007); Department for Business, Energy and Industrial Strategy (2007–2015) Home Office (1974–1992); Department for Culture, Media and Sport (1992–present)

Postmaster General of the United Kingdom was a Cabinet ministerial position in HM Government. From at least 1609, this government officer held a monopoly power to deliver mails and corresponding duties to build and maintain the various elements of the postal system; the Telegraph Act 1868 extended these to electric telegraphs. These arrangements would subsequently be expanded to cover telecommunications and broadcasting.

The office was abolished in 1969 by the Post Office Act 1969. A replacement public corporation, governed ultimately by a board and chairman, was established under the name of the Post Office (later subsumed by Royal Mail Group). The cabinet position of Postmaster General was replaced by a Minister of Posts and Telecommunications, with reduced powers, until 1974; most regulatory functions have now been delegated to the Secretary of State for Science, Innovation and Technology and the Secretary of State for Business and Trade.

== History ==
In England, the monarch's letters to his subjects are known to have been carried by relays of couriers as long ago as the 15th century. The earliest mention of Master of the Posts is in the King's Book of Payments where a payment of £100 was authorised for Brian Tuke as master of the posts in February 1512. Belatedly, in 1517, he was officially appointed to the office of Governor of the King's Posts, a precursor to the office of Postmaster General of the United Kingdom, by Henry VIII. In 1609 it was decreed that letters could only be carried and delivered by persons authorised by the Postmaster General.

In 1655 John Thurloe became Postmaster-General, a post he held until he was accused of treason and arrested in May 1660. His spies were able to intercept mail, and he exposed Edward Sexby's 1657 plot to assassinate Cromwell and captured would-be assassin Miles Sindercombe and his group. Ironically, Thurloe's own department was also infiltrated: his secretary Samuel Morland became a Royalist agent and in 1659 alleged that Thurloe, Richard Cromwell and Sir Richard Willis – a Sealed Knot member turned Cromwell agent – were plotting to kill the future King Charles II. About forty years after his death, a false ceiling was found in his rooms at Lincoln's Inn, the space was full of letters seized during his occupation of the office of Postmaster-General. These letters are now at the Bodleian Library.

In 1657 an act of the Commonwealth Parliament, entitled 'Postage of England, Scotland and Ireland Settled', set up a system for the British Isles and enacted the position of Postmaster General. The act also reasserted the postal monopoly for letter delivery and for post horses. After the Restoration in 1660, a further act, the Post Office Act 1660 (12 Cha. 2. c. 35), confirmed this and the post of Postmaster-General, the previous Cromwellian act being void.

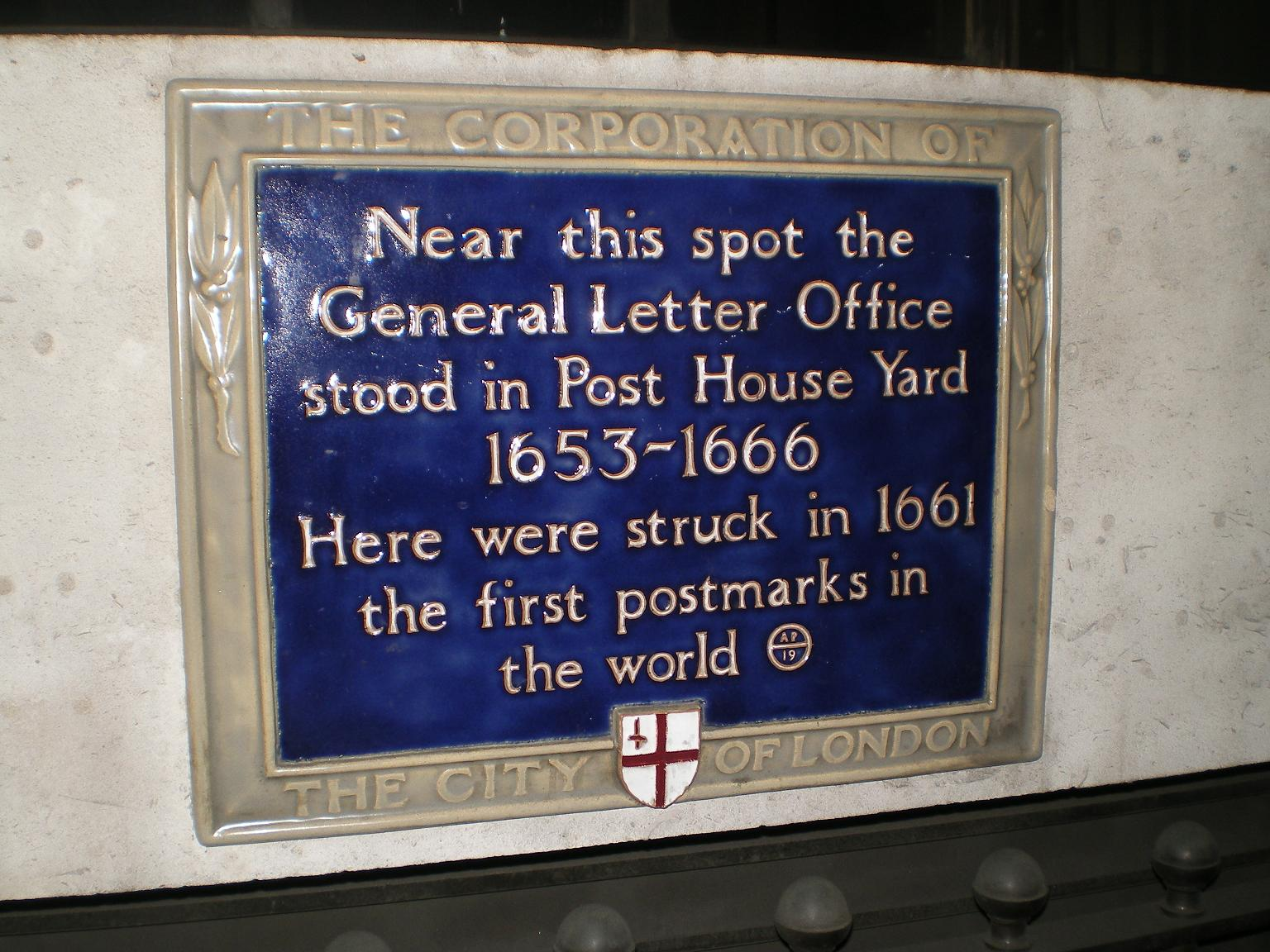
The former site of the General Letter Office in London

1660 saw the establishment of the General Letter Office, which would later become the General Post Office (GPO). A similar position evolved in the Kingdom of Scotland prior to the 1707 Act of Union.

Postmaster-General Act 1831
- Act of Parliament
- Parliament of the United Kingdom
- Long title: An Act for enabling His Majesty to appoint a Postmaster General for the United Kingdom of Great Britain and Ireland.
- Citation: 1 Will. 4. c. 8
- Territorial extent: United Kingdom

Dates
- Royal assent: 11 March 1831
- Commencement: 11 March 1831 (Note: Section 1.)
- Repealed: 1 August 1837
Other legislation
Repealed by	Post Office (Repeal of Laws) Act 1837

Status: Repealed

Text of statute as originally enacted

The Postmaster-General Act 1831 (1 Will. 4. c. 8) established the unified office of Postmaster General of the United Kingdom

The office was abolished in 1969 by the Post Office Act 1969. A new public corporation, governed by a chairman, was established under the name of the Post Office (the part later subsumed by Royal Mail), which also had responsibility for telecommunications and the Girobank). The cabinet position of Postmaster General was initially replaced by a Minister of Posts and Telecommunications with less direct involvement; this department was dissolved in March 1974, with regulatory functions transferring to the Home Office, the Post Office retaining control of television licensing. Since 1992, most regulatory functions formerly conducted by the Postmaster General generally fall within the remit of the Secretary of State for Culture, Media and Sport, although the present-day Royal Mail Group was overseen by the Secretary of State for Business, Energy and Industrial Strategy until flotation.

== Masters of the King's Post ==
Years	Master of the King's Post
1517–1545	Brian Tuke
1545–1566	John Mason
1566–1590	Thomas Randolph
1590–1607	John Stanhope, 1st Baron Stanhope
1607–1635	Charles Stanhope, 2nd Baron Stanhope
1637–1642	Philip Burlamachi
1642–1649	Edmund Prideaux

== Postmaster under the Commonwealth ==
Years	Postmaster under the Commonwealth
1649–1653	Edmund Prideaux
1653–1655	John Manley
1655–1660	John Thurloe

== Postmasters General of England, Great Britain, and the United Kingdom ==
The earliest postmasters had responsibility for England and Wales. In 1707, on the Union with Scotland, the responsibility of the office was extended to cover the whole of the new Kingdom of Great Britain as well as Ireland, but with some powers held by a Post Office Manager for Scotland. By the Post Office (Revenues) Act 1710, with effect from 1711, the services were united, but with a Deputy Postmaster for Scotland. From 1784, there were also Postmasters General of Ireland, but under the Postmaster-General Act 1831, the postmasters based at Westminster became responsible for the whole of the United Kingdom of Great Britain and Ireland. In 1922, the Irish Free State became independent, and in 1923 it established its own arrangements under a Postmaster General of the Irish Free State. In 1924 the title became Minister for Posts and Telegraphs.

Years	Postmaster General
1660–1663	Henry Bishop
1663–1664	Daniel O'Neill
1664–1667	Katherine O'Neill, Countess of Chesterfield
1667–1685	Henry Bennet, 1st Earl of Arlington
1686–1689	Laurence Hyde, 1st Earl of Rochester
1689–1691	John Wildman

=== Two Postmasters General, 1691–1823 ===
From 1691 to 1823 there were two Postmasters General, to divide the patronage between the Whigs and Tories.

Year	1st Postmaster General	1st Party	2nd Postmaster General	2nd Party
1691	Sir Thomas Frankland		Sir Robert Cotton	Tory
1708	Sir Thomas Frankland		Sir John Evelyn	
1715	James Craggs the Elder		Charles Cornwallis, 4th Baron Cornwallis	Whig
1720	Galfridus Walpole		Edward Carteret	
1725	Edward Harrison		Edward Carteret	
1733	Thomas Coke, 1st Baron Lovel (Earl of Leicester from 1744)		Edward Carteret	
1739	Thomas Coke, 1st Baron Lovel (Earl of Leicester from 1744)		Sir John Eyles, 2nd Baronet	
1745	Thomas Coke, 1st Baron Lovel (Earl of Leicester from 1744)		Everard Fawkener	
1759	Robert Hampden, 4th Baron Trevor		William Ponsonby, 2nd Earl of Bessborough	
1762	Robert Hampden, 4th Baron Trevor		John Perceval, 2nd Earl of Egmont	
1763	Robert Hampden, 4th Baron Trevor		Thomas Villiers, 1st Baron Hyde	
1765	Thomas Robinson, 1st Baron Grantham		William Ponsonby, 2nd Earl of Bessborough	
1766	Wills Hill, 2nd Viscount Hillsborough		Francis Dashwood, 11th Baron le Despencer	
1768	John Montagu, 4th Earl of Sandwich		Francis Dashwood, 11th Baron le Despencer	
1771	Henry Carteret (from 1784 Baron Carteret)		Francis Dashwood, 11th Baron le Despencer	
1782	Henry Carteret (from 1784 Baron Carteret)		The Viscount Barrington	
1782	Henry Carteret (from 1784 Baron Carteret)		Charles Bennet, 4th Earl of Tankerville	
1783	Henry Carteret (from 1784 Baron Carteret)		Thomas Foley, 2nd Baron Foley	
1784	Henry Carteret (from 1784 Baron Carteret)		Charles Bennet, 4th Earl of Tankerville	
1786	Henry Carteret (from 1784 Baron Carteret)		Thomas Villiers, 1st Earl of Clarendon	
1787	Henry Carteret (from 1784 Baron Carteret)		Thomas de Grey, 2nd Baron Walsingham	
1789	John Fane, 10th Earl of Westmorland	Tory	Thomas de Grey, 2nd Baron Walsingham	
1790	Philip Stanhope, 5th Earl of Chesterfield		Thomas de Grey, 2nd Baron Walsingham	
1794	Philip Stanhope, 5th Earl of Chesterfield		George Townshend, 1st Earl of Leicester	
1798	William Eden, 1st Baron Auckland		George Townshend, 1st Earl of Leicester	
1799	William Eden, 1st Baron Auckland		George Leveson-Gower, Baron Gower	
1801	William Eden, 1st Baron Auckland		Lord Charles Spencer	
1804	James Graham, 3rd Duke of Montrose		Lord Charles Spencer	
1806	John Proby, 1st Earl of Carysfort		Robert Hobart, 4th Earl of Buckinghamshire	
1807	Thomas Pelham, 2nd Earl of Chichester	Whig	John Montagu, 5th Earl of Sandwich	Tory
1814	Thomas Pelham, 2nd Earl of Chichester	Whig	Richard Trench, 2nd Earl of Clancarty	
1816	Thomas Pelham, 2nd Earl of Chichester	Whig	James Cecil, 1st Marquess of Salisbury	

=== A single Postmaster General, 1823–1900 ===
In 1823 the idea of a Whig and a Tory sharing the post was abolished.

Years	Postmaster General
1823	Thomas Pelham, 2nd Earl of Chichester continuing in office alone
1826–1827	Lord Frederick Montagu
1827–1830	William Montagu, 5th Duke of Manchester
1830–1834	Charles Lennox, 5th Duke of Richmond and Lennox
1834	Francis Nathaniel Conyngham, 2nd Marquess Conyngham
1834–1835	William Wellesley-Pole, 1st Baron Maryborough
1835	Francis Nathaniel Conyngham, 2nd Marquess Conyngham
1835–1841	Thomas William Anson, 1st Earl of Lichfield
1841–1845	William Lowther, Viscount Lowther
1845–1846	Edward Granville Eliot, 3rd Earl of St Germans
1846–1852	Ulick John de Burgh, 1st Marquess of Clanricarde
1852	Charles Philip Yorke, 4th Earl of Hardwicke
1853–1855	Charles John Canning, 2nd Viscount Canning
1855–1858	George Douglas Campbell, 8th Duke of Argyll
1858–1859	Charles Edward Abbot, 2nd Baron Colchester
1859–1860	James Bruce, 8th Earl of Elgin
1860–1866	Edward John Stanley, 2nd Baron Stanley of Alderley
1866–1868	James Graham, 4th Duke of Montrose
1868–1871	Spencer Compton Cavendish, Marquess of Hartington
1871–1873	William Monsell
1873–1874	Lyon Playfair
1874–1880	Lord John Manners
1880–1884	Henry Fawcett
1884–1885	George John Shaw-Lefevre
1885–1886	Lord John Manners
1886	George Grenfell Glyn, 2nd Baron Wolverton
1886–1891	Henry Cecil Raikes
1891–1892	Sir James Fergusson
1892–1895	Arnold Morley
1895–1900	Henry Howard, 15th Duke of Norfolk

=== Postmaster General, 1900–1969 ===
Portrait	Name (Birth–Death)	Term of office		Party	Ministry
	Charles Vane-Tempest-Stewart, 6th Marquess of Londonderry (1852–1915)	10 April 1900 (in Cabinet from 2 November 1900)	8 August 1902	Conservative	Salisbury IV
	Austen Chamberlain; MP for East Worcestershire (1863–1937)	8 August 1902	6 October 1903	Conservative	Balfour
	Edward Stanley, Lord Stanley; MP for Westhoughton (1865–1948)	6 October 1903	10 December 1905	Conservative	Balfour
	Sydney Buxton; MP for Poplar (1853–1934)	10 December 1905	14 February 1910	Liberal	Campbell-Bannerman
	Sydney Buxton; MP for Poplar (1853–1934)	10 December 1905	14 February 1910	Liberal	Asquith I
	Herbert Samuel; MP for Cleveland (1870–1963)	14 February 1910	11 February 1914	Liberal	Asquith II
	Herbert Samuel; MP for Cleveland (1870–1963)	14 February 1910	11 February 1914	Liberal	Asquith III
	Charles Hobhouse; MP for Bristol East (1862–1941)	11 February 1914	25 May 1915	Liberal	Asquith III
	Herbert Samuel; MP for Cleveland (1870–1963)	26 May 1915	18 January 1916	Liberal	Asquith Coalition (Lib.–Con.–et al.)
	Joseph Pease; MP for Rotherham (1860–1943)	18 January 1916	5 December 1916	Liberal	Asquith Coalition (Lib.–Con.–et al.)
	Albert Illingworth; MP for Heywood until 1918; MP for Heywood and Radcliffe from 1918 (1865–1942)	10 December 1916	1 April 1921	Liberal	Lloyd George I
	Albert Illingworth; MP for Heywood until 1918; MP for Heywood and Radcliffe from 1918 (1865–1942)	10 December 1916	1 April 1921	Liberal	Lloyd George II
	Frederick Kellaway; MP for Bedford (1870–1933)	1 April 1921	19 October 1922	Liberal	Lloyd George II
	Neville Chamberlain; MP for Birmingham Ladywood (1869–1940)	31 October 1922	12 March 1923	Conservative	Law
	Sir William Joynson-Hicks, 1st Baronet; MP for Twickenham (1865–1932)	12 March 1923	28 May 1923	Conservative	Law
	Sir William Joynson-Hicks, 1st Baronet; MP for Twickenham (1865–1932)	12 March 1923	28 May 1923	Conservative	Baldwin I
	Sir Laming Worthington-Evans, 1st Baronet; MP for Colchester (1868–1931)	28 May 1923	22 January 1924	Conservative	Baldwin I
	Vernon Hartshorn; MP for Ogmore (1872–1931)	22 January 1924	11 November 1924	Labour	MacDonald I
	Sir William Mitchell-Thomson; MP for Croydon South (1877–1938)	11 November 1924	7 June 1929	Conservative	Baldwin II
	Hastings Lees-Smith; MP for Keighley (1878–1941)	7 June 1929	2 March 1931	Labour	MacDonald II
	Clement Attlee; MP for Limehouse (1883–1967)	2 March 1931	3 September 1931	Labour	MacDonald II
	William Ormsby-Gore; MP for Stafford (1895–1964)	3 September 1931	10 November 1931	Conservative	National I (N.Lab.–Con.–et al.)
	Sir Kingsley Wood; MP for Woolwich West (1881–1943)	10 November 1931	7 June 1935	Conservative	National I (N.Lab.–Con.–et al.)
	Sir Kingsley Wood; MP for Woolwich West (1881–1943)	10 November 1931	7 June 1935	Conservative	National II
	George Tryon; MP for Brighton (1871–1940)	7 June 1935	3 April 1940	Conservative	National III (Con.–N.Lab.–et al.)
	George Tryon; MP for Brighton (1871–1940)	7 June 1935	3 April 1940	Conservative	National IV
	George Tryon; MP for Brighton (1871–1940)	7 June 1935	3 April 1940	Conservative	Chamberlain War
	William Morrison; MP for Cirencester and Tewkesbury (1893–1961)	3 April 1940	7 November 1943	Conservative	Chamberlain War
	William Morrison; MP for Cirencester and Tewkesbury (1893–1961)	3 April 1940	7 November 1943	Conservative	Churchill War (All parties)
	Harry Crookshank; MP for Gainsborough (1893–1961)	7 November 1943	4 August 1945	Conservative	Churchill War (All parties)
	Harry Crookshank; MP for Gainsborough (1893–1961)	7 November 1943	4 August 1945	Conservative	Churchill Caretaker (Con.–Lib.N.)
	William Hare, 5th Earl of Listowel (1906–1997)	4 August 1945	17 April 1947	Labour	Attlee I
	Wilfred Paling; MP for Wentworth (1883–1971)	17 April 1947	28 February 1950	Labour	Attlee I
	Ness Edwards; MP for Caerphilly (1897–1969)	28 February 1950	5 November 1951	Labour	Attlee II
	Herbrand Sackville, 9th Earl De La Warr (1900–1976)	5 November 1951	7 April 1955	Conservative	Churchill III
	Charles Hill; MP for Luton (1904–1989)	7 April 1955	16 January 1957	National Liberal	Eden
	Ernest Marples; MP for Wallasey (1907–1978)	16 January 1957	22 October 1959	Conservative	Macmillan I
	Reginald Bevins; MP for Liverpool Toxteth (1908–1996)	22 October 1959	19 October 1964	Conservative	Macmillan II
	Reginald Bevins; MP for Liverpool Toxteth (1908–1996)	22 October 1959	19 October 1964	Conservative	Douglas-Home
	Tony Benn; MP for Bristol South East (1925–2014)	19 October 1964	4 July 1966	Labour	Wilson I
	Tony Benn; MP for Bristol South East (1925–2014)	19 October 1964	4 July 1966	Labour	Wilson II
	Edward Short; MP for Newcastle upon Tyne Central (1912–2012)	4 July 1966	6 April 1968	Labour	Wilson II
	Roy Mason; MP for Barnsley (1924–2015)	6 April 1968	1 July 1968	Labour	Wilson II
	John Stonehouse; MP for Wednesbury (1925–1988)	1 July 1968	1 October 1969	Labour	Wilson II

=== Minister of Posts and Telecommunications, 1969–1974 ===
Portrait	Name (Birth–Death)	Term of office		Party	Ministry
	John Stonehouse; MP for Wednesbury (1925–1988)	1 October 1969	19 June 1970	Labour	Wilson II
	Christopher Chataway; MP for Chichester (1931–2014)	24 June 1970	7 April 1972	Conservative	Heath
	John Eden; MP for Bournemouth West (1925–2020)	7 April 1972	4 March 1974	Conservative	Heath

== See also ==
- Postmaster General (disambiguation)
- Postmasters General of Ireland
- Postmaster General for Scotland
- Postmaster and Deputy Postmaster for Canada 1763–1851 – who reported to the Postmaster General of the United Kingdom
- Postmaster General of Canada
- Postmaster General of Hong Kong – created in 1870 to replace the Royal Mail and under British administration until 1 July 1997
