= Francis Mitchell (knight) =

Last English knight to be publicly degraded

Francis Mitchell (c. 1556 – died in or after 1628) was the last English knight of the realm to be publicly degraded (stripped of his knighthood), after being found guilty of extorting money from licensees following his being granted monopoly on the licensing of inns by George Villiers, 1st Duke of Buckingham and James I.

== Political career ==
Mitchell was probably of an Essex family. He matriculated at Magdalen Hall, Oxford, about 1574 and seems to have been subsequently employed as private secretary to a succession of noblemen. In a letter to Secretary Conway (February 1626) he speaks of having served 'six great persons' in that capacity, but only gives the name of Lord Burgh, lord deputy of Ireland. He was secretary from 1594 to 1597 to Sir William Russel, lord deputy, and was probably in the employment of William Davison and Lord Salisbury — possibly in the service of the latter he visited Rome, where he was imprisoned by the inquisition. He appears to have performed services in Scotland on behalf of James VI before that king's accession to the English throne. Doubtless through the favour of one of his patrons he secured (25 May 1603) the grant in reversion of the office of clerk of the market for life. He seems to have returned from abroad, where he had been travelling for six years, about 1611, and subsequently to have lived in Clerkenwell as a justice for Middlesex. There is an entry in the register of St. James, Clerkenwell, dated 16 Aug. 1612, of the marriage of Francis Michell and Sisley Wentworth.

== Impeachment and degradation ==
While Parliament was dissolved under the order of James I, grievances against monopolists grew to such an extent that it was one of the first orders of business that the House of Commons discussed when Parliament sat in 1621. Early in James' reign it had been established in the case of Darcy v. Allein that monopolies were in breach of both common and statute law, because they raised the price of the commodity, lowered the standard of the product and put craftsmen out of work. The judges in the Darcy case ruled that monopolies were only acceptable when a new invention was introduced or when the interests of the state demanded it. The grants of monopolies had continued nevertheless, and despite Parliament's complaints in 1606, 1610, and 1614, little action had been taken. Grants of monopolies were a method of rewarding the supporters of the current royal favourite—at that time, Buckingham.

Mitchell and Giles Mompesson had been granted monopolies over the licensing of inns. This monopoly aroused particularly bad feeling. They were called before the Commons, where Mitchell was sentenced, without a hearing, for his "grievous exactions" in the first impeachment for 162 years. (The previous impeachment was that of Lord Stanley in 1459, for not sending his troops to the Battle of Blore Heath.)

After the sentencing had taken place, doubt as to the legality of the impeachment was raised, as the Commons did not have jurisdiction over areas that did not concern their privileges. Having failed to find a precedent for their actions, the Commons were forced to refer the matter to the House of Lords. The Lords quickly confirmed the verdict, sentencing Mitchell to be fined, imprisoned and degraded. The impeachments of Mitchell, Mompesson and Sir Francis Bacon are registered in the Parliament of 1621. James and Buckingham did little to defend their dependents, being more eager to distance themselves from the charges.

Mitchell's degradation at Westminster Hall took the form of his spurs being broken and thrown away, his belt cut and his sword broken over his head. Finally, he was pronounced to be "no longer a Knight but Knave". After the ceremony, he was made to march through the streets to the Tower of London where he was imprisoned. Mompesson was also sentenced to degradation but fled to France to avoid punishment.

Political offices
Preceded by Henry Wotton	Chief Secretary for Ireland; 1600	Succeeded by George Cranmer
