= Daniel O'Neill (Royalist) =

Irish army officer, politician, courtier and postmaster general

Postmaster General of the United Kingdom
- In office 1660–1663
- Preceded by: Henry Bishop (postmaster general)
- Succeeded by: Katherine Stanhope, Countess of Chesterfield

Personal details
- Born: between 1602 and 1612 Castlereagh, County Down, Kingdom of Ireland
- Died: 24 October 1664 Whitehall, Kingdom of England
- Resting place: Boughton Malherbe
- Spouse: Katherine Stanhope
- Occupation: Soldier, spy

Daniel O'Neill (Irish: Dónall Ó Néill; c. 1612 in Castlereagh – 24 October 1664 in Whitehall) was an Irish army officer, politician, courtier and postmaster general. He was part of the O'Neill Dynasty of Ulster, the nephew of Owen Roe O'Neill and the great-nephew of Hugh O'Neill, Earl of Tyrone.

== Early life ==
O'Neill was the eldest son of Con Mac Niall O'Neill, lord of Upper Clandeboye and his wife, Eilis (a paternal niece of Hugh O'Neill, 2nd Earl of Tyrone). The date, and even the year of his birth is unknown. A monument on his tomb, erected by his step-son, reads: "He died A.D. 1663 aged 60", suggesting he was born in 1602 or 1603. The historian Donal F. Cregan points out that the inscription can not be relied upon, as it lists the wrong year for his death. A pamphlet from the First English Civil War described him as being around 30 in 1642, while in 1616 one of his younger brothers was described as being around four or five, suggesting he was born anywhere between 1602 and 1612. His Oxford Dictionary of National Biography entry lists his birth year as c. 1612. In all, O'Neill had three younger siblings: two brothers; Aodh Buidhe and Con Og, and one sister; Catherine.

His father lost land after defeat at the Siege of Kinsale, leaving O'Neill to inherit a small estate at a young age in 1619. He then became a ward of Chancery and was raised in England as an Anglican. His estate was later given to The 1st Viscount Montgomery and O'Neill and his brother were granted an annuity.

== Army service ==
According to Clarendon, O'Neill had spent many years between the court and Low Countries, "the winter season in one and the summer always in the army in the other; as good an education towards advancement in the world as that age knew". Lee states he was a volunteer under Sir Horace Vere fighting the Spanish in the Low Countries before 1635, (Note: N.B. Sir Horace Vere died in 1635 and stopped fighting in 1632) and may have been under the direct command of Vere's nephew Lord Edward Conway. His uncle Owen Roe O'Neill was fighting there for the Spanish and D'Alton claims Daniel kept him abreast of affairs at home.

In 1635 Lord Conway petitioned Archbishop Laud for help in getting O'Neill fairly treated by Montgomery and Hamilton. On several occasions, Laud wrote to Thomas Wentworth (later Earl of Strafford), who was the Lord Deputy of Ireland. Wentworth promised to do his best and had sent for Montgomery's and Hamilton's agents to treat with him. There was little chance of his father's lands being restored, but there was a strong case that Montgomery and Hamilton should pay a fair rent on the land Daniel (and his brother) had inherited. Success arguably relied on Montgomery's and Hamilton's good will. Daniel was not destitute, but his share of the £160 received in rents likely prevented Daniel advancing in society. Wentworth was also petitioned by Prince Charles, the elector Palatine and promised to "... endeavour cheerfully to procure Mr Oneale [sic] contentment ..." Wentworth likely helped progress Daniel's career, but not his fortune. After a summer probably fighting in the Low Countries, Daniel swore the oath of allegiance and was granted a pass "to go beyond the seas" with two servants in December 1636. He fought at the (fourth) Siege of Breda in 1637 where he sustained a thigh wound and was forced to return to England to recuperate.

His petitioning hadn't stopped and had likely become a nuisance with importuning His Majesty (Charles 1 of England), which resulted in a rebuke for Wentworth. In 1638 Wentworth wrote to His Majesty describing O'Neill as a "vey slight and busy person" who was very conversant at Thomas Howard's Arundel House and dependent (for an annuity of £400) on the Earl of Antrim, Randal MacDonnell. He enclosed a passage from a letter by O'Neill to Captain Byron and assured the King he would "so colour the matter, as to take away all thought of ... going to Carlisle". According to Fitpatrick's commentary this was to warn the King against fighting the Scottish Covenanters that started the Bishops' Wars in 1639. O'Neill was captain of a troop of horse, "to which he was by all men held very equal, having had good experience in the most active armies of that time, and a courage very notorious". Charles 1 believed in the divine right of Kings and thought he could raise an army and win against the Covenanters without the support of Parliament. The war effectively ended in a truce later that year and a retreat from Berwick. O'Neill went to Breda with letters for the Queen of Bohemia. He was in Ireland by April 1640, where he was made a freeman of the borough of Belfast. Following a request at Breda by Sir John Conyers to Lord Conway, O'Neill was promoted to major within Conyers' regiment where he fought in the second Bishops' War. At the Battle of Newburn on 28 August 1640, Conway was ordered by Wentworth (now Earl Strafford) to prevent Leslie's army crossing the river, despite being outnumbered 4 to 1. O'Neill was in a cavalry charge where he was subsequently captured along with Lord Wilmot's son, Sir John Digby and many others. Lord Conway's troops retreated under cover of darkness to Durham. Leslie treated his prisoners well and they were released at the Treaty of Rippon in October 1640. By April 1641, O'Neill was back in Conyer's regiment, when he took his case against Montgomery and Hamilton to the House of Lords. The case was dismissed because O'Neill had not taken it to the lower courts first.

== Royalist cause ==
Fleeing to Brussels, O'Neill gathered troops and arms for the royalist campaigns in the English Civil War. Formally, his first position in the royalist army was that of a major in Colonel Osborne's 14th regiment of foot, but as an experienced cavalry officer, he transferred to serve under Prince Rupert of the Rhine, the royalist cavalry general. His part association with the Palatinate family gave him good standing with the prince, who appointed him as a lieutenant colonel, commanding his own cavalry regiment. Early on in the war, he fought busily at the Battle of Powick Bridge, and later at Edgehill. He was sent to relieve Reading in 1643, but the force was repelled, and during the retreat was shot in the thigh. He subsequently fought at Chalgrove Field, where he killed the Parliamentarian standard bearer, regaining honours for his regiment they had lost at the Battle of Hopton Heath. He also later fought at the First Battle of Newbury. After failing to secure negotiations in the Irish Confederate Wars, O'Neill went on to serve as a spy to the de jure Charles II at The Hague.

== The Restoration ==
In September 1660, O'Neill married Katherine Stanhope, Countess of Chesterfield becoming her third husband. He became the King's sole gunpowder maker by a 21-year patent in November 1660. This grant included a £2,000 advance to build gunpowder mills and stove houses, and to annually import 240 tons of saltpetre duty-free. Saltpetre was a key ingredient of gunpowder and by this time the majority was imported by the English East India Company. O'Neill had no experience in gunpowder manufacture and in December 1660 he awarded 2½ year contracts to James Lloyd at Wandsworth and Thomas Carter at Bedfont to produce 480 barrels per month.

At The Restoration the post office was farmed for £21,500 to Henry Bishop for seven years . Bishop surrendered the balance of his lease to O'Neill having been accused of abuses. O'Neill was appointed Postmaster-General in 1663, a position he held for just one year until his death. He had a monopoly on the carrying of letters and had an obligation to search out unauthorised carriers. The Court realised that farming the post was a good investment even though the rates and routes had to be adhered to. A proclamation was made that none but O'Neale [sic] were permitted to carry or deliver letters and postmasters had, upon pain of dismissal, to provide a certificate of conformity from the Church of England within six months.

O'Neill was granted the Belsize House estate by Charles II, located south of Hampstead. He significantly rebuilt the manor house in 1663. The grounds later became a pleasure garden and subsequently gave their name to the Belsize Park district.

== Appointments ==
- Groom of the Chamber 1644–49, 1661–64

== Death ==
Upon O'Neill's death King Charles II, wrote that:
Poor O'Neill died this afternoon of an ulcer in his guts. He was as honest a man as ever lived. I am sure I have lost a very good servant by it.

O'Neill died on 24 October 1664 whereupon his wife Katherine Stanhope, resigned the gunpowder contract, but retained his postmastership. Along with O'Neill, upon her death she was also interred in the parish church of Boughton Malherbe, Kent.

== Sources ==
- Casway, Jerrold I (2008) [2004]. "O'Neill, Daniel". Oxford Dictionary of National Biography (online ed.). Oxford University Press. doi:10.1093/ref:odnb/20768. (Subscription, Wikipedia Library access or UK public library membership required.)
- Cregan, Donal F (1963). "An Irish Cavalier: Daniel O'Neill". Studia Hibernica (3). Liverpool University Press: 60–100. doi:10.3828/sh.1963.3.2. JSTOR 20495745. S2CID 240932650.
- Cregan, Donal F (1964). "An Irish Cavalier: Daniel O'Neill in the Civil Wars 1642–51". Studia Hibernica (4). Liverpool University Press: 104–133. doi:10.3828/sh.1964.4.5. JSTOR 20495784. S2CID 242365511.

Parliament of England
Preceded by James Praed and John Basset	Member of Parliament for St Ives; 1662–1665; With: James Praed	Succeeded by James Praed and Edward Nosworthy
Political offices
Preceded by Henry Bishop	Postmaster General; 1663–1664	Succeeded by The Countess of Chesterfield
