= Rolls-Royce Enthusiasts' Club =

British automobile association

The Rolls-Royce Enthusiasts' Club (RREC) is an international association for owners and admirers of Rolls-Royce and Bentley cars.

It was founded by eleven people on 11 August 1957 in the living room of Edward Harris in Oxfordshire, England. The club has since grown to 5,000 in 1988 to 10,000 members in 2010, in 52 countries. The club is headquartered in The Hunt House, Paulerspury, Northamptonshire in the UK.

The RREC is officially licensed by Rolls-Royce Motor Cars and holds the build records for all historic Rolls-Royce and Bentley cars. The club also educates enthusiasts, owners and mechanics with its workshops, engine rooms and archives.

The club holds many events throughout the year, the largest occasion being the RREC Annual Rally, held at various locations in the East Midlands.
