= Thomas Wotton, 2nd Baron Wotton =

Thomas Wotton, 2nd Baron Wotton (1587 – 2 April 1630) was an English peer.

Wotton was born the younger son of Edward Wotton, 1st Baron Wotton. His elder brother Pickering died at Valladolid in 1604. In 1608, he married Mary Throckmorton (d. 1658), eldest daughter and co-heir of Sir Arthur Throckmorton of Paulerspury, Northamptonshire. He inherited his father's title in 1628.

== Children ==
- Charles, baptised 1611 at Paulerspury, Northamptonshire (an estate inherited by his mother), died in infancy.
- Katherine (1609–1667), later created Countess of Chesterfield.
- Hester (1615–1646), married Baptist Noel, 3rd Viscount Campden.
- Margaret married Sir John Tufton, 2nd Baronet.
- Anne (1629–), married Sir Edward Hales.

He died at Boughton Malherbe, Kent and was buried there 12 April 1630. As he died without a male heir, his title became extinct.

Peerage of England
Preceded by Edward Wotton	Baron Wotton; 1626–1630	Extinct
