= Arthur Throckmorton =

Member of the Parliament of England

Sir Arthur Throckmorton (c. 1557 – 21 July 1626) was an English courtier and politician.

He was the second son of the diplomat Sir Nicholas Throckmorton of Beddington, Surrey and was educated at Magdalen College, Oxford. His sister Elizabeth incurred the Queen's displeasure by secretly marrying Sir Walter Raleigh.

Arthur travelled abroad from 1580 to 1582 after which he joined the court of Queen Elizabeth I. He was elected the Member of Parliament for Colchester, Essex in 1589. He was knighted in 1596 whilst on a military expedition to Cadiz, and appointed High Sheriff of Northamptonshire in 1604.

Arthur inherited estates in several counties on the death of his father in 1571 (his elder brother was adjudged a lunatic) and after his marriage opted to reside at Paulerspury in Northamptonshire, where he replaced the medieval manor house and created gardens.

He married Ann, the daughter of Sir Thomas Lucas of Colchester, Essex, with whom he had four daughters. The eldest daughter, Mary, married Sir Thomas Wotton, and inherited the manor of Alderminster from her father. Their second daughter, Ann, married Sir Peter Temple of Stowe. Their third daughter, Elizabeth, married Richard Lennard, 13th Baron Dacre, and inherited the manor of Cosgrove from her father.

Arthur Throckmorton died at Paulerspury in 1626, where there is a monument. His will includes a silver gilt cup, engraved with the Throckmorton and Carew heraldry, which had been a diplomatic gift from Mary, Queen of Scots to his father.

== Notes ==
Honorary titles
Preceded by William Tate of Delapré Abbey	High Sheriff of Northamptonshire; 1604	Succeeded by John Freeman of Great Billing
