= Paulerspury =

Village in Northamptonshire, England

Coordinates: 52.1032°N 0.9575°W

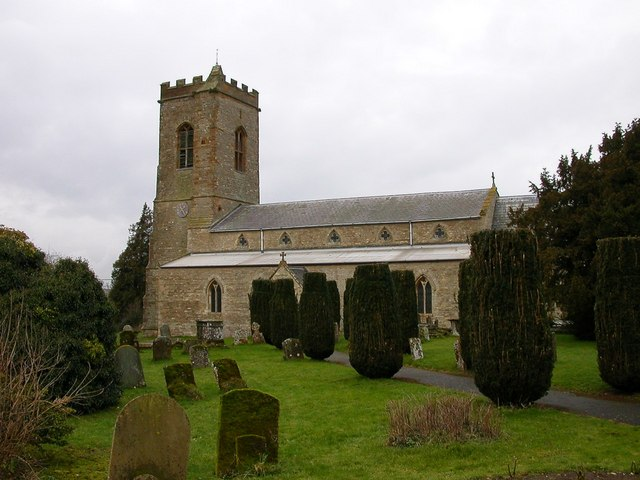
- Church of St James the Great

- Location within Northamptonshire
- Population: 1,018 (2011)
- OS grid reference: SP7145
- Unitary authority: West Northamptonshire
- Ceremonial county: Northamptonshire
- Region: East Midlands
- Country: England
- Sovereign state: United Kingdom
- Post town: Towcester
- Postcode district: NN12
- Dialling code: 01327
- Police: Northamptonshire
- Fire: Northamptonshire
- Ambulance: East Midlands
- UK Parliament: South Northamptonshire

Paulerspury is a civil parish and small village in West Northamptonshire, England. It is approximately 3 miles (5 km) south of Towcester and 8 miles (13 km) north of Milton Keynes along the A5 road (which follows the course of the Roman Road of Watling Street). The parish also contains the hamlets or villages of Pury End, Pury Hill and Heathencote. At the time of the 2001 census, its population was 991 people and the 2011 population was 1,018.

== History ==
Originally called simply Pear-tree, the village owes its name to the de Pavelli family. It is referred to in the Domesday Book of 1086 as Paveli's Peri – a reference to orchards in the area and the lord of the manor Paveli. It was the birthplace in 1761 of William Carey, son of a weaver, who first established the Protestant mission in India.

In the 1800s, the place was known as Pauler's Perry.

Paulerspury has known significant historical events. Although the site of the final battle of Queen Boudicca is not confirmed, one of the three locations believed most likely is Cuttle Mill in Paulerspury. During Elizabethan times, the lords of the manor, the Throckmortons became prominent nobles, and local legend has it that the Queen and her favourite Sir Walter Raleigh stayed in the village (which led to the marriage of Bess Throckmorton to Sir Walter). The restored church has a Norman font and displays good Early English work. The effigies of Sir Arthur Throckmorton (1626) and his lady lie on a long tomb. There are also two rare wooden figures, representing Sir Laurence de Paveley (1329) and his wife.

During the Industrial Revolution, little industry developed in the area, it mostly being an agricultural community, and the main produce other than agriculture was lace. It has been claimed that Queen Victoria favoured Paulespury lace. This led to an impoverished community as lacemaking was superseded by mass-produced textiles. This is in stark contrast to the village of today, which is a wealthy commuter village for Milton Keynes and London.

== Governance ==
The village has an elected Parish Council. It is in South Northamptonshire parliamentary constituency.

== Amenities ==
Paulerspury has a Church of England primary school, and the Barley Mow pub. It is the home of the Grafton Hunt and the headquarters of the Rolls-Royce Enthusiasts' Club.

== Notable residents ==
- Edward Bernard (1638–1697), English scholar, Savilian professor of astronomy at the University of Oxford from 1673 to 1691, was born in the village.
- Sir Benjamin Bathurst (c.1639 – 1704), British politician, Governor of the East India and Levant companies and a Cofferer of the Royal Household; former lord of the manor.
- William Carey (1761–1834), English missionary to India
