= Margaret Wotton, Marchioness of Dorset =

English noblewoman (c. 1485–1541)

Margaret Wotton
- Marchioness of Dorset
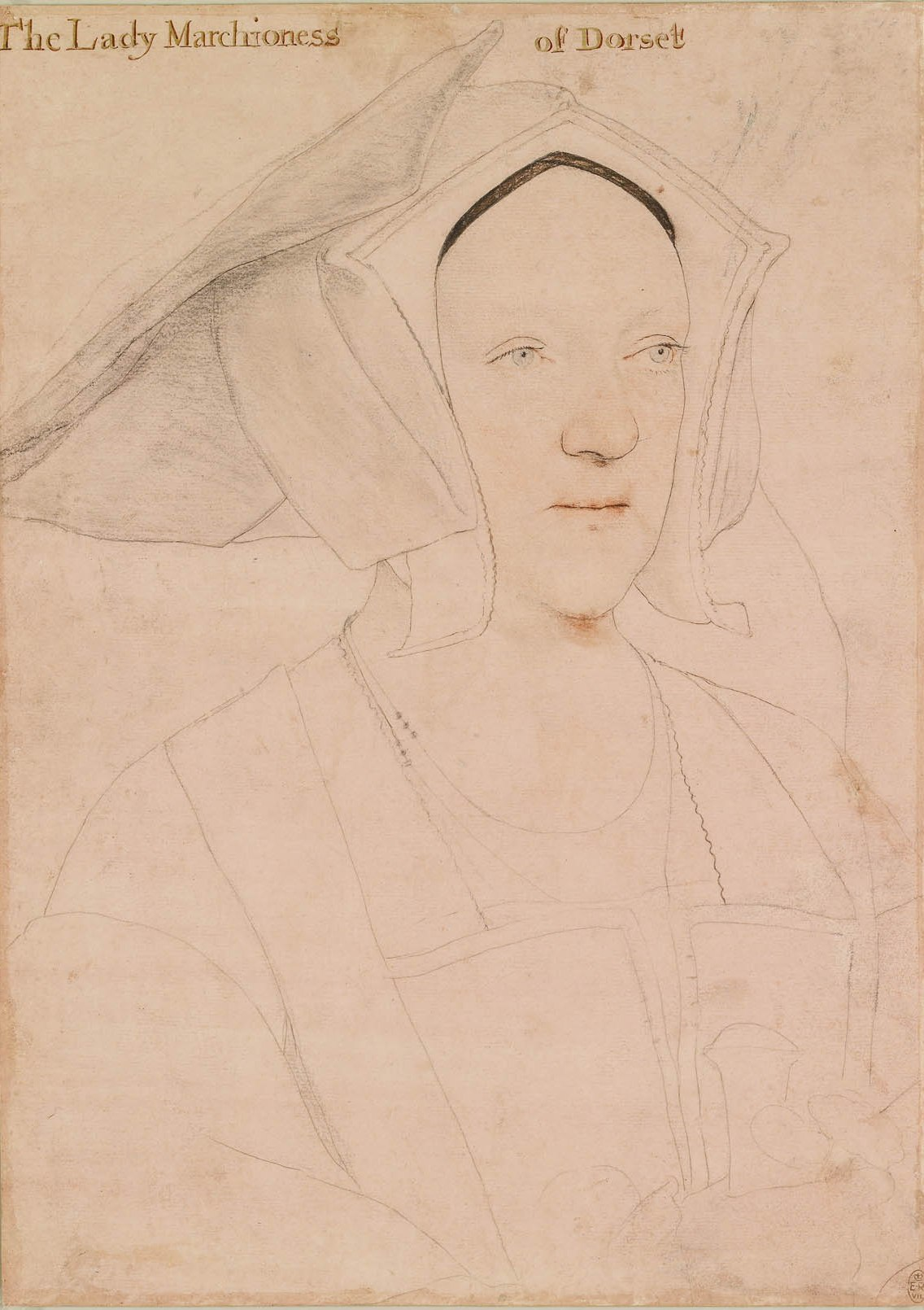
- Sketch of Margaret by Hans Holbein the Younger
- Born: 1485
- Died: c. 1541; England
- Spouses: William Medley; Thomas Grey, 2nd Marquess of Dorset
- Issue: George Medley; Lady Elizabeth Grey; Lady Katherine Grey; Lady Anne Grey; Henry Grey, 1st Duke of Suffolk; Lord John Grey; Lord Thomas Grey; Leonard Grey; Lady Mary Grey
- Father: Sir Robert Wotton
- Mother: Anne Belknap

Margaret Wotton, Marchioness of Dorset (1485 – 1541) was the second wife of Thomas Grey, Marquess of Dorset, and the mother of his children, including Henry Grey, Duke of Suffolk, with whom she engaged in many quarrels during his minority over money and his allowance. Her lack of generosity to Henry shocked her peers as unmotherly, and inappropriate behaviour toward a high-ranking nobleman, relative of King Henry VIII of England.

In 1534, Wotton was compelled to answer the charges that she was an "unnatural mother".

On 10 September 1533, Wotton stood as one of the godmothers of the future Queen Elizabeth I of England. She was the subject of two portraits by Hans Holbein the Younger. One of her many grandchildren was Lady Jane Grey.

== Family ==
Margaret was born in 1485, the daughter of Robert Wotton of Boughton Malherbe, Kent, and Anne Belknap, daughter of Henry Belknap, and sister of Edward Belknap, Two of her brothers held important positions in the government. Edward Wotton was Treasurer of Calais, and Nicholas Wotton was a diplomat who arranged the marriage of Henry VIII to Anne of Cleves in 1539.

== Marriages and issue ==
In 1505, Wotton married her first husband, William Medley, by whom she had one son, George (died 1562). In 1509, sometime after the death of her husband in February of that year, she married as his second wife, Thomas Grey, 2nd Marquess of Dorset, the eldest son of Thomas Grey, 1st Marquess of Dorset by Cecily Bonville, Baroness Harington and Bonville. She was styled Marchioness of Dorset upon her marriage.

By her second husband, Wotton had four sons and four daughters:

- Elizabeth Grey (1510–1564), who married first Thomas Audley, 1st Baron Audley of Walden and second George Norton.
- Katherine Grey (1512 – 1 May 1542), who married Henry Fitzalan, 19th Earl of Arundel.
- Anne Grey (died 1548), who married Henry Willoughby (slain 27 August 1549 during Kett's Rebellion) of Wollaton, Nottinghamshire.
- Henry Grey, 1st Duke of Suffolk (12 January 1517 – 23 February 1554), who married Lady Frances Brandon.
- Lord John Grey of Pirgo (1523 – 19 November 1564) married Mary Browne, daughter of Anthony Browne sometime before 1547.
- Lord Thomas Grey (1526 – after 1554), who was executed together with his brother, Henry, for having participated in Thomas Wyatt's rebellion in 1554..
- Leonard Grey.
- Mary Grey.

Wotton and her husband were part of the group who accompanied Henry VIII's sister, Princess Mary, to France in the autumn of 1514, for the latter's wedding to King Louis XII of France.

In October 1530, her husband died, and Wotton was given custody of all his property during their eldest son, Henry's minority.

On 10 September 1533 at Greenwich Palace, Wotton stood as one of the two godmothers of Princess Elizabeth, daughter of Henry VIII and Anne Boleyn, who would later rule as Queen Elizabeth I of England. Three months earlier, on 1 June, Margaret had ridden in Anne Boleyn's coronation procession from the Tower of London to Westminster Abbey.

Wotton was the subject of two portraits by Hans Holbein the Younger.

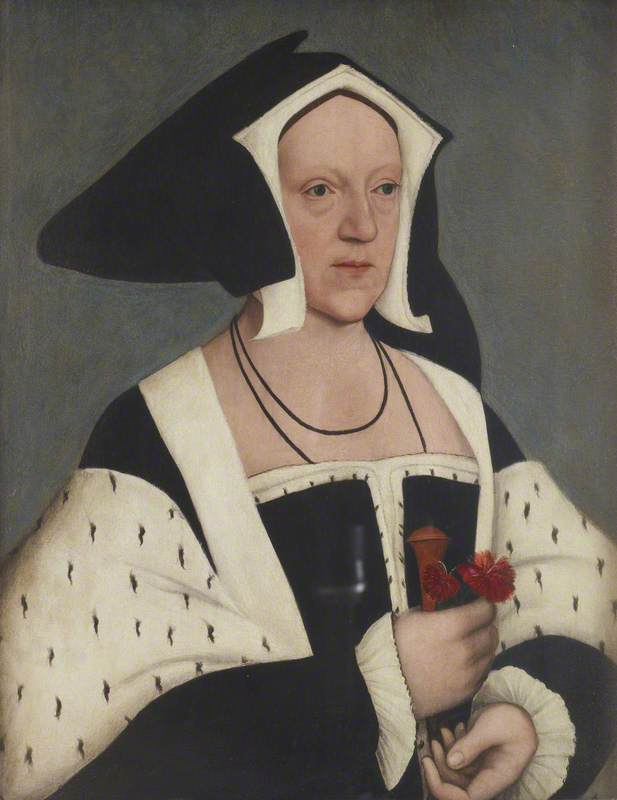
Portrait of Margaret Wotton, Marchioness of Dorset, after Hans Holbein the Younger

== Quarrels with her son ==
Wotton first began a long series of quarrels with her son, who had succeeded to the Marquessate of Dorset in 1530, when he was forced to pay a fine of £4000 for breach of contract after he had renounced his betrothal to Katherine Fitzalan, daughter of the Earl of Arundel. As a result, she tried to restrict his allowance throughout his minority, which caused much consternation from her peers, who labelled her actions "unmotherly", and inappropriate behaviour towards a nobleman closely related to the King. Margaret only agreed to Henry's marriage with Lady Frances Brandon, niece of the King, on the condition that her father, Charles Brandon, 1st Duke of Suffolk, would support the couple until her son reached his majority.

In 1534, Wotton felt compelled to answer charges that she was "an unnatural mother". As a result, she offered to contribute to her son's advancement "as my small power is and shall be".

Several years later when he came of age, Henry brought his quarrel with his mother before the Kings' Council, where Wotton belatedly admitted that her son's allowance was not "meet or sufficient to maintain his estate", and she offered to increase it. Henry was not appeased, therefore she moved out of the Grey family seat at Bradgate House; however, Henry would not let her remove her personal property, so she wrote a letter to Thomas Cromwell, pleading with him to order her son to release her goods.

It is most likely Wotton died in the 1540s, and some sources suggest she died in 1541.
