= Nicholas Wotton =

English diplomat, cleric and courtier (c. 1497–1567)

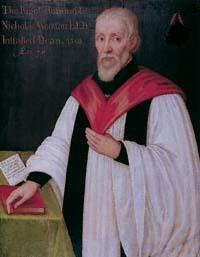
Dean Nicholas Wotton, by an unknown artist

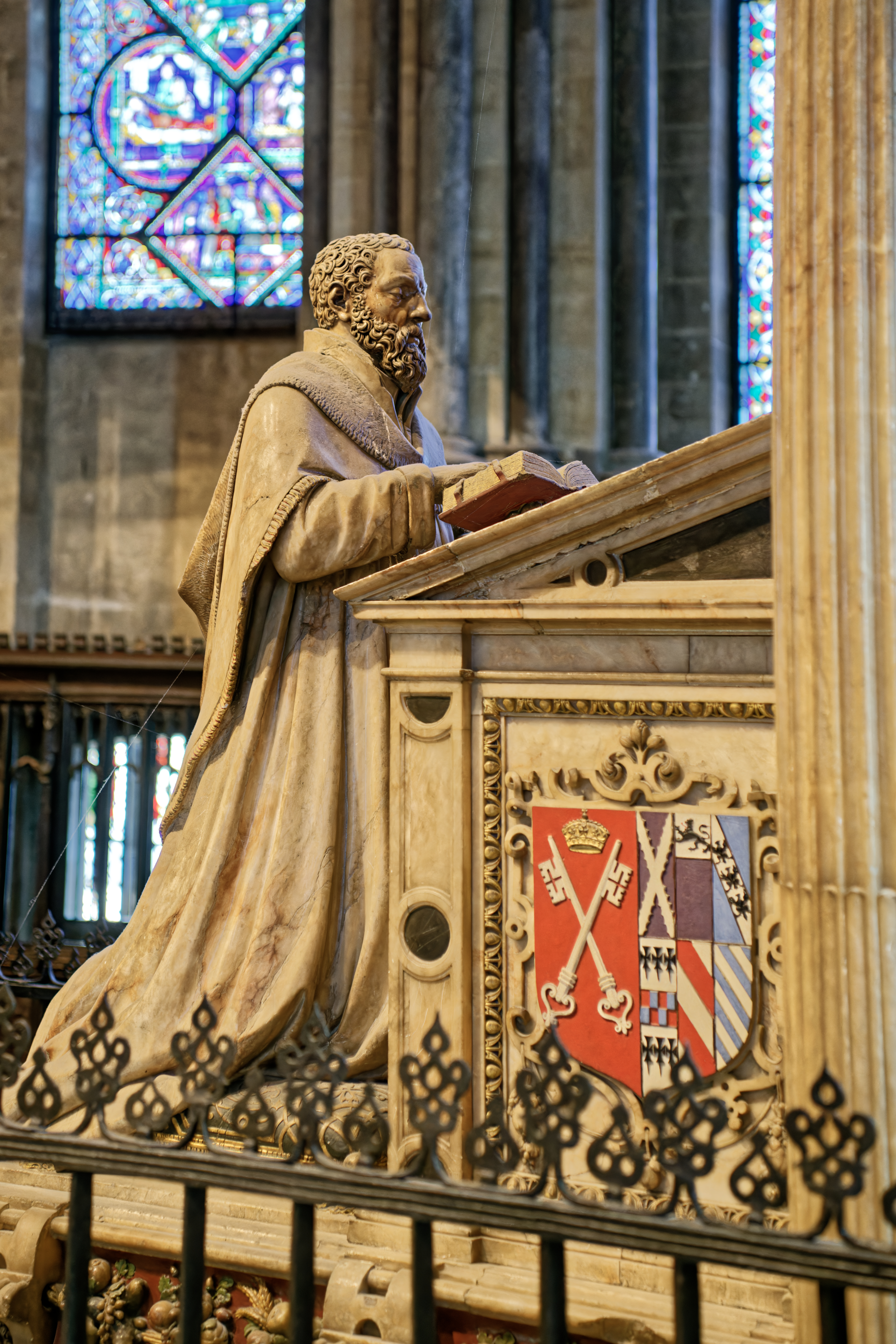
Monument to Wotton in Canterbury Cathedral

Nicholas Wotton (c. 1497 – 26 January 1567) was an English diplomat, cleric and courtier. He served as Dean of York and Royal Envoy to Charles V, Holy Roman Emperor.

== Life ==
He was a son of Sir Robert Wotton of Boughton Malherbe, Kent, and a descendant of Sir Nicholas Wotton, Lord Mayor of London in 1415 and 1430, who was Member of Parliament for the City from 1406 to 1429.

Soon after ordination Wotton was granted the benefices of Boughton Malherbe and of Sutton Valence, and later of Ivychurch, Kent. Desirous of a more worldly career, he entered the service of Prince-Bishop Cuthbert Tunstall, then Bishop of London. Having helped to draw up the Institution of a Christian Man, Wotton in 1539 went to arrange the marriage between Henry VIII and Anne of Cleves and the union of Protestant princes which was to be the complement of this union. Wotton crossed over to England with the new royal bride but, unlike Thomas Cromwell, he did not lose the royal favour when the king repudiated Anne.

In 1541, having already refused the bishopric of Hereford, he became the first post-Reformation Dean of Canterbury and in 1544 Dean of York. In 1543 he went on diplomatic business to the Netherlands, and for the next year or two he had much intercourse with the Emperor Charles V. He helped to conclude the Treaty of Ardres between England and France in 1546, and was Ambassador resident in France from 1546 to 1549. Henry VIII made Wotton an executor of his Will and left him £300, and in October 1549, under Edward VI the post of Minister of State lay vacant; he held the post for about a year until succeeded by the unimpeachable Protestant Sir William Cecil.

In 1550 Wotton was again sent as Royal Envoy to the Holy Roman Emperor and as Ambassador to France during the reign of Mary, doing valuable work in that capacity securing the peace. His secretary in Paris was John Somers. In January 1555, Wotton described a demonstration of a new kind of cannon made by the Italian designer Bartolomeo Campi or his brother.

Wotton left France in 1557, but in 1558 he was again in that kingdom, helping to arrange the preliminaries of the Treaty of Cateau-Cambrésis. In 1560 he signed the Treaty of Edinburgh on behalf of Elizabeth I, and he had again visited the Netherlands before his death in London.

He is buried in the Trinity Chapel of Canterbury Cathedral.

== Relatives ==
His brother Sir Edward Wotton was made Treasurer of Calais in 1540, and was one of those who took part in the overthrow of the Lord Protector Somerset.

His nephew, Thomas Wotton (1521–1587) was the father of Sir Henry Wotton and of Edward Wotton, 1st Baron Wotton.\

His sister Margaret was the mother of Henry Grey, 1st Duke of Suffolk, and the grandmother of Lady Jane Grey.

== Notes ==
Church of England titles
New office	Dean of Canterbury; 1541–1567	Succeeded by Thomas Godwin
Political offices
Preceded by Sir Thomas Smith; Sir William Petre	Secretary of State; 1549-1550; With: Sir William Petre	Succeeded by Sir William Cecil; Sir William Petre
