= Katherine Stanhope, Countess of Chesterfield =

English courtier

The Right Honourable The Countess of Chesterfield
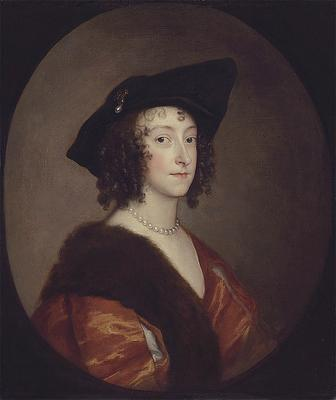
- Katherine, Lady Stanhope by Anthony van Dyck
- Born: 1609; Boughton Malherbe, Kent
- Died: 9 April 1667 (age 58); Belsize Park, Middlesex
- Occupation: Courtier
- Spouse(s): (1) Henry Stanhope, Lord Stanhope (d. 1634) (2) Johan van der Kerckhove, Lord of Heenvliet (d. 1660) (3) Daniel O'Neill (d. 1664)
- Children: Mary Stanhope (1629–1660); Catherine Stanhope (c.1633–1662); Philip Stanhope, 2nd Earl of Chesterfield (1634–1713); Charles van der Kerckhove, 1st Earl of Bellomont (1643–1683); Amelie van der Kerckhove (1646–1663); Dorothea Helena van der Kerckhove (d. 1703)
- Parent(s): Thomas Wotton, 2nd Baron Wotton (1587–1630) and Mary Throckmorton (d. 1658)

Katherine Stanhope, Countess of Chesterfield (1609–1667) was an English courtier. She was the governess and confidante of Mary, Princess Royal and Princess of Orange, and the first woman to hold the office of Postmaster General of England (1664–1667).

== Life ==
She was the elder daughter of Thomas Wotton, 2nd Baron Wotton, by his wife Mary Throckmorton, a daughter of Sir Arthur Throckmorton of Paulerspury, Northamptonshire.

=== Career ===
After the marriage of William II and Princess Royal, Mary, in May 1641, the widow Lady Stanhope was sent to Holland as the governess/coutier to the Princess Royal. She married Lord Heenvliet of Holland at around the same time. With her own two Stanhope children of roughly the same age as the Princess Mary, she was able to help raise the child bride princess in an English setting at Heenvliet’s estate in Holland. As the princess came of age, Lady Stanhope grew to become her confidante and adviser. During the English Civil War, Lady Stanhope sided with Charles I and his heir, King Charles II; she is said to have supplied them both politically and financially, and to have been involved in much of the royalist plots of that decade.

After the death of Heenvliet in 1660, Charles II made her the Countess of Chesterfield in recognition of both her service and her friendship. She remained in princess Mary's service until the latter's death from illness on 24 December 1660. She then passed into the service of Anne Hyde, Duchess of York, and in 1662 to Queen Catherine of Braganza, wife of Charles II.

In 1662, Lady Catherine married her friend Daniel O'Neill (d.1664), Postmaster General, another one of the King's men during the civil war. Upon his death in 1664, she increased her by then already considerable wealth by inheriting O'Neill's office of Postmaster General.

== Marriages and progeny ==
She married three times:

- Firstly in 1628 to Henry Stanhope, Lord Stanhope (d.1634), 2nd surviving son of Philip Stanhope, 1st Earl of Chesterfield, by whom she had progeny two daughters and a son:
  - Philip Stanhope, 2nd Earl of Chesterfield, who in 1656 inherited the Earldom of Chesterfield from his grandfather.
  - Mary Stanhope
  - Catherine Stanhope
- Secondly in early 1641, after being courted by several suitors, she married the Dutchman Jehan van der Kerckhove, Lord of Heenvliet (d.1660), one of the diplomats involved in negotiating the marriage between William II, Prince of Orange and Mary, the Princess Royal, daughter of King Charles I, future parents of King William III of England.
- Thirdly in 1662 to Daniel O'Neill (d.1664), Postmaster General, a Royalist during the civil war.

== Death ==
She died of an edema in 1667, and was buried on her father's estate.

== Notes ==
Political offices
Preceded by Daniel O'Neill	Postmaster General (in right of her deceased husband); 1664–1667	Succeeded by The Earl of Arlington
