= Henry Stanhope, Lord Stanhope =

English nobleman and politician

Henry Stanhope, Lord Stanhope KB (died 29 November 1634), known as Sir Henry Stanhope until 1628, was an English nobleman and politician.

He was the second and next surviving son of Philip Stanhope, 1st Earl of Chesterfield and his first wife Catherine Hastings, daughter of Francis Hastings, Lord Hastings, oldest son of George Hastings, 4th Earl of Huntingdon. Amongst his younger brothers were Ferdinando Stanhope and Arthur Stanhope, while his nephew was James Stanhope, 1st Earl Stanhope. He entered the English House of Commons in 1625, sitting for Nottinghamshire in the following two parliaments until 1626. In the third parliament of 1628, he represented East Retford until the next year. At the coronation of King Charles I of England in 1625, he was made a Knight of the Order of the Bath.

On 4 December 1628, he married Katherine Wotton, daughter of Thomas Wotton, 2nd Baron Wotton in Boughton Malherbe in Kent. They had two daughters and two sons. The first son, Wotton, died in infancy and the second, Philip, succeeded his grandfather as earl. Stanhope died intestate in St Martin-in-the-Fields, London and was buried in Boughton Malherbe three days later. Having been governess of Mary, Princess Royal and Princess of Orange and having supplied the royal troops with money and weapons during the English Civil War, his wife was created Countess of Chesterfield for life by King Charles II of England after the English Restoration.

== Children ==
Children with Katherine Wotton, Countess of Chesterfield:

- Lady Mary Stanhope (b. 7 October 1629)
- Lady Catherine Stanhope (d. 19 Nov 1662)
- Wotton Stanhope (d. December 1632)
- Philip Stanhope, 2nd Earl of Chesterfield (1634 – 28 Jan 1714)

Parliament of England
Preceded by Robert Sutton; Sir Gervase Clifton	Member of Parliament for Nottinghamshire; 1625–1626; With: Sir Gervase Clifton 1625; Sir Thomas Hutchinson 1626	Succeeded by Sir John Byron; Sir Gervase Clifton
Preceded by Sir Francis Wortley; John, Lord Haughton	Member of Parliament for East Retford; 1628–1629; With: Sir Edward Osborne	Parliament suspended until 1640
