= List of United Kingdom locations: Gr-Gred =

The United Kingdom

This is part of the list of United Kingdom locations: a gazetteer of place names in the United Kingdom showing each place's locality and geographical coordinates.

== Gra ==
Location	Locality	Coordinates (links to map & photo sources)	OS grid reference
Grabhair	Western Isles	58.04°N 06.45°W	NB3715
Graby	Lincolnshire	52.84°N 00.38°W	TF0929
Gracca	Cornwall	50.39°N 04.80°W	SX0159
Gracemount	City of Edinburgh	55.90°N 03.16°W	NT2768
Grade	Cornwall	49.98°N 05.19°W	SW7114
Graemsay	Orkney Islands	58.92°N 03.29°W	HY256053
Graffham	West Sussex	50.94°N 00.69°W	SU9217
Grafham	Surrey	51.15°N 00.54°W	TQ0241
Grafham	Cambridgeshire	52.30°N 00.29°W	TL1669
Grafton	Herefordshire	52.02°N 02.74°W	SO4937
Grafton	Worcestershire	52.03°N 02.03°W	SO9837
Grafton	Oxfordshire	51.69°N 01.62°W	SP2600
Grafton	North Yorkshire	54.06°N 01.37°W	SE4163
Grafton	Shropshire	52.75°N 02.84°W	SJ4318
Grafton Flyford	Worcestershire	52.20°N 02.05°W	SO9656
Grafton Regis	Northamptonshire	52.10°N 00.90°W	SP7546
Grafton Underwood	Northamptonshire	52.41°N 00.64°W	SP9280
Grafty Green	Kent	51.20°N 00.67°E	TQ8748
Grahamston	Falkirk	56.00°N 03.79°W	NS8880
Graianrhyd	Denbighshire	53.09°N 03.18°W	SJ2156
Graig	Rhondda, Cynon, Taff	51.59°N 03.35°W	ST0689
Graig	Carmarthenshire	51.68°N 04.25°W	SN4401
Graig	Conwy	53.24°N 03.80°W	SH8074
Graig	Wrexham	52.92°N 03.14°W	SJ2337
Graig	Denbighshire	53.23°N 03.38°W	SJ0872
Graig-Fawr	Swansea	51.71°N 04.02°W	SN6004
Graig-fechan	Denbighshire	53.07°N 03.28°W	SJ1454
Graig Felen	Swansea	51.70°N 03.91°W	SN6802
Graig Penllyn	The Vale Of Glamorgan	51.48°N 03.48°W	SS9777
Graig Trewyddfa	Swansea	51.65°N 03.93°W	SS6697
Grain	Kent	51.45°N 00.70°E	TQ8876
Grains Bar	Oldham	53.56°N 02.06°W	SD9608
Grainsby	Lincolnshire	53.47°N 00.08°W	TF2799
Grainthorpe	Lincolnshire	53.45°N 00.07°E	TF3897
Grainthorpe Fen	Lincolnshire	53.43°N 00.06°E	TF3795
Graizelound	North Lincolnshire	53.47°N 00.84°W	SK7798
Gramasdail / Gramsdal	Western Isles	57.47°N 07.32°W	NF8155
Grampound	Cornwall	50.29°N 04.90°W	SW9348
Grampound Road	Cornwall	50.31°N 04.93°W	SW9150
Granborough	Buckinghamshire	51.91°N 00.89°W	SP7625
Granby	Nottinghamshire	52.91°N 00.88°W	SK7536
Grandborough	Warwickshire	52.29°N 01.28°W	SP4966
Grandpont	Oxfordshire	51.74°N 01.26°W	SP5105
Grandtully	Perth and Kinross	56.64°N 03.77°W	NN9152
Grange	Dorset	50.81°N 01.98°W	SU0102
Grange	Kent	51.38°N 00.57°E	TQ7968
Grange	East Ayrshire	55.60°N 04.52°W	NS4137
Grange	Cumbria	54.54°N 03.16°W	NY2517
Grange	North Yorkshire	54.31°N 02.10°W	SD9391
Grange	Lancashire	53.77°N 02.65°W	SD5731
Grange	North East Lincolnshire	53.55°N 00.11°W	TA2508
Grange (Runcorn)	Cheshire	53.32°N 02.72°W	SJ5281
Grange	Wirral	53.36°N 03.17°W	SJ2286
Grange (Warrington)	Cheshire	53.40°N 02.54°W	SJ6490
Grange	Perth and Kinross	56.41°N 03.20°W	NO2625
Grange Crossroads	Moray	57.57°N 02.88°W	NJ4754
Grange Estate	Dorset	50.80°N 01.84°W	SU1101
Grange Hill	Essex	51.60°N 00.07°E	TQ4492
Grange Hill	Durham	54.65°N 01.64°W	NZ2329
Grangemill	Derbyshire	53.11°N 01.64°W	SK2457
Grange Moor	Kirklees	53.64°N 01.66°W	SE2216
Grangemouth	Falkirk	56.01°N 03.71°W	NS9381
Grange of Lindores	Fife	56.33°N 03.21°W	NO2516
Grange-Over-Sands	Cumbria	54.18°N 02.92°W	SD4077
Grangepans	Falkirk	56.01°N 03.60°W	NT0081
Grange Park	Enfield	51.63°N 00.10°W	TQ3195
Grange Park	Northamptonshire	52.19°N 1.01°W	SP765552
Grange Park	St Helens	53.44°N 02.76°W	SJ4994
Grangetown	Cardiff	51.45°N 03.19°W	ST1774
Grangetown	Sunderland	54.87°N 01.37°W	NZ4054
Grangetown	Redcar and Cleveland	54.57°N 01.15°W	NZ5520
Grange Villa	Durham	54.86°N 01.64°W	NZ2352
Grange Village	Gloucestershire	51.80°N 02.48°W	SO6712
Gransmoor	East Riding of Yorkshire	54.01°N 00.29°W	TA1259
Gransmore Green	Essex	51.87°N 00.45°E	TL6922
Granston	Pembrokeshire	51.96°N 05.07°W	SM8934
Grantchester	Cambridgeshire	52.17°N 00.09°E	TL4355
Grantham	Lincolnshire	52.91°N 00.64°W	SK9136
Grantley	North Yorkshire	54.11°N 01.64°W	SE2369
Grantley Hall	North Yorkshire	54.11°N 01.63°W	SE2469
Granton	City of Edinburgh	55.97°N 03.23°W	NT2376
Grantown-on-Spey	Highland	57.32°N 03.61°W	NJ0327
Grantsfield	Herefordshire	52.23°N 02.70°W	SO5260
Grantshouse	Scottish Borders	55.87°N 02.30°W	NT8165
Grant Thorold	North East Lincolnshire	53.56°N 00.06°W	TA2809
Grappenhall	Cheshire	53.37°N 02.54°W	SJ6486
Grasby	Lincolnshire	53.52°N 00.37°W	TA0804
Grasmere	Cumbria	54.45°N 03.03°W	NY3307
Grasscroft	Oldham	53.53°N 02.04°W	SD9704
Grassendale	Liverpool	53.35°N 02.91°W	SJ3985
Grassgarth (Sebergham)	Cumbria	54.78°N 03.02°W	NY3444
Grassgarth (Hugill)	Cumbria	54.38°N 02.86°W	SD4499
Grass Green	Essex	52.01°N 00.51°E	TL7338
Grassington	North Yorkshire	54.07°N 02.00°W	SE0064
Grassmoor	Derbyshire	53.18°N 01.40°W	SK4066
Grass Point	Argyll and Bute	56.41°N 05.66°W	NM743304
Grassthorpe	Nottinghamshire	53.19°N 00.81°W	SK7967
Grasswell	Sunderland	54.84°N 01.48°W	NZ3350
Grateley	Hampshire	51.16°N 01.61°W	SU2741
Gratton	Devon	50.86°N 04.28°W	SS3910
Gratwich	Staffordshire	52.87°N 01.97°W	SK0231
Gravel	Cheshire	53.19°N 02.51°W	SJ6666
Gravel Castle	Kent	51.19°N 01.16°E	TR2149
Graveley	Cambridgeshire	52.26°N 00.18°W	TL2464
Graveley	Hertfordshire	51.92°N 00.21°W	TL2327
Gravel Hill	Buckinghamshire	51.60°N 00.55°W	TQ0091
Gravelhill	Shropshire	52.71°N 02.77°W	SJ4813
Gravel Hole	Oldham	53.57°N 02.13°W	SD9109
Gravel Hole	Shropshire	52.91°N 02.95°W	SJ3636
Gravelly Hill	Birmingham	52.50°N 01.85°W	SP1090
Gravels	Shropshire	52.59°N 02.99°W	SJ3300
Gravelsbank	Shropshire	52.59°N 02.99°W	SJ3300
Graveney	Kent	51.32°N 00.94°E	TR0562
Gravenhunger Moss	Shropshire	52.97°N 02.40°W	SJ7342
Gravesend	Kent	51.44°N 00.37°E	TQ6574
Gravesend	Hertfordshire	51.912°N 00.091°E	TL435255
Grayingham	Lincolnshire	53.45°N 00.60°W	SK9396
Grayrigg	Cumbria	54.36°N 02.66°W	SD5797
Grays	Essex	51.46°N 00.31°E	TQ6177
Grayshott	Hampshire	51.10°N 00.75°W	SU8735
Grayson Green	Cumbria	54.61°N 03.56°W	NX9925
Grayswood	Surrey	51.09°N 00.70°W	SU9134
Grazeley	Berkshire	51.38°N 01.00°W	SU6966
Grazeley Green	Berkshire	51.39°N 01.03°W	SU6767

== Gre ==
=== Grea ===
==== Greal-Greas ====
Location	Locality	Coordinates (links to map & photo sources)	OS grid reference
Grealin	Highland	57.57°N 06.18°W	NG5061
Grean / Grithean	Western Isles	56.99°N 07.48°W	NF6703
Greasbrough	Rotherham	53.45°N 01.38°W	SK4195
Greasby	Wirral	53.37°N 03.12°W	SJ2587
Greasley	Nottinghamshire	53.01°N 01.27°W	SK4947

==== Great ====
===== Great A – Great D =====
Location	Locality	Coordinates (links to map & photo sources)	OS grid reference
Great Abington	Cambridgeshire	52.10°N 00.23°E	TL5348
Great Addington	Northamptonshire	52.35°N 00.60°W	SP9574
Great Alne	Warwickshire	52.22°N 01.82°W	SP1259
Great Altcar	Lancashire	53.54°N 03.02°W	SD3206
Great Amwell	Hertfordshire	51.79°N 00.02°W	TL3612
Great Asby	Cumbria	54.51°N 02.49°W	NY6813
Great Ashfield	Suffolk	52.26°N 00.91°E	TL9967
Great Ashley	Wiltshire	51.35°N 02.27°W	ST8162
Great Ayton	North Yorkshire	54.49°N 01.13°W	NZ5611
Great Baddow	Essex	51.71°N 00.48°E	TL7205
Great Bardfield	Essex	51.94°N 00.42°E	TL6730
Great Barford	Bedfordshire	52.15°N 00.36°W	TL1252
Great Barr	Sandwell	52.54°N 01.94°W	SP0494
Great Barrington	Gloucestershire	51.81°N 01.71°W	SP2013
Great Barrow	Cheshire	53.20°N 02.81°W	SJ4668
Great Barton	Suffolk	52.26°N 00.75°E	TL8867
Great Barugh	North Yorkshire	54.19°N 00.86°W	SE7478
Great Bavington	Northumberland	55.11°N 02.03°W	NY9880
Great Bealings	Suffolk	52.08°N 01.25°E	TM2348
Great Bedwyn	Wiltshire	51.37°N 01.61°W	SU2764
Great Bentley	Essex	51.84°N 01.06°E	TM1121
Great Bernera	Western Isles	58.21°N 06.85°W	NB152351
Great Berry	Essex	51.55°N 00.40°E	TQ6787
Great Billing	Northamptonshire	52.25°N 00.81°W	SP8162
Great Bircham	Norfolk	52.85°N 00.61°E	TF7632
Great Blakenham	Suffolk	52.10°N 01.09°E	TM1250
Great Blencow	Cumbria	54.68°N 02.85°W	NY4532
Great Bolas	Shropshire	52.78°N 02.53°W	SJ6421
Great Bookham	Surrey	51.27°N 00.38°W	TQ1354
Great Bosullow	Cornwall	50.14°N 05.62°W	SW4133
Great Bourton	Oxfordshire	52.10°N 01.34°W	SP4545
Great Bowden	Leicestershire	52.48°N 00.91°W	SP7488
Great Bower	Kent	51.23°N 00.90°E	TR0352
Great Bradley	Suffolk	52.15°N 00.42°E	TL6653
Great Braxted	Essex	51.79°N 00.69°E	TL8614
Great Bricett	Suffolk	52.11°N 00.96°E	TM0350
Great Brickhill	Buckinghamshire	51.96°N 00.69°W	SP9030
Great Bridge	Sandwell	52.52°N 02.04°W	SO9792
Great Bridgeford	Staffordshire	52.83°N 02.17°W	SJ8826
Great Brington	Northamptonshire	52.27°N 01.03°W	SP6665
Great Bromley	Essex	51.89°N 01.02°E	TM0826
Great Broughton	Cumbria	54.66°N 03.44°W	NY0731
Great Broughton	North Yorkshire	54.44°N 01.16°W	NZ5406
Great Buckland	Kent	51.34°N 00.38°E	TQ6663
Great Budworth	Cheshire	53.28°N 02.51°W	SJ6677
Great Burdon	Darlington	54.53°N 01.52°W	NZ3116
Great Burstead	Essex	51.60°N 00.42°E	TQ6892
Great Busby	North Yorkshire	54.43°N 01.19°W	NZ5205
Great Canfield	Essex	51.83°N 00.30°E	TL5918
Great Carlton	Lincolnshire	53.34°N 00.11°E	TF4185
Great Casterton	Rutland	52.66°N 00.52°W	TF0008
Great Cellws	Powys	52.26°N 03.36°W	SO0764
Great Chalfield	Wiltshire	51.36°N 02.20°W	ST8663
Great Chart	Kent	51.13°N 00.82°E	TQ9841
Great Chatwell	Staffordshire	52.72°N 02.31°W	SJ7914
Great Chell	City of Stoke-on-Trent	53.06°N 02.19°W	SJ8752
Great Chesterford	Essex	52.05°N 00.18°E	TL5042
Great Cheveney	Kent	51.15°N 00.47°E	TQ7342
Great Cheverell	Wiltshire	51.28°N 02.03°W	ST9854
Great Chilton	Durham	54.66°N 01.55°W	NZ2930
Great Chishill	Cambridgeshire	52.02°N 00.06°E	TL4238
Great Clacton	Essex	51.80°N 01.14°E	TM1716
Great Claydons	Essex	51.68°N 00.54°E	TL7602
Great Cliff	Wakefield	53.64°N 01.54°W	SE3016
Great Clifton	Cumbria	54.64°N 03.48°W	NY0429
Great Coates	North East Lincolnshire	53.57°N 00.14°W	TA2310
Great Cobb Island	Essex	51.76°N 00.87°E	TL986112
Great Comberton	Worcestershire	52.07°N 02.07°W	SO9542
Great Common	West Sussex	51.03°N 00.56°W	TQ0127
Great Common	Suffolk	52.42°N 01.48°E	TM3787
Great Corby	Cumbria	54.87°N 02.82°W	NY4754
Great Cornard	Suffolk	52.02°N 00.73°E	TL8840
Great Cowden	East Riding of Yorkshire	53.86°N 00.14°W	TA2242
Great Coxwell	Oxfordshire	51.63°N 01.62°W	SU2693
Great Crakehall	North Yorkshire	54.29°N 01.63°W	SE2489
Great Cransley	Northamptonshire	52.37°N 00.78°W	SP8376
Great Cressingham	Norfolk	52.57°N 00.72°E	TF8501
Great Crosby	Sefton	53.48°N 03.02°W	SJ3299
Great Crosthwaite	Cumbria	54.60°N 03.14°W	NY2624
Great Cubley	Derbyshire	52.93°N 01.76°W	SK1638
Great Cumbrae	North Ayrshire	55.76°N 04.92°W	NS168559
Great Dalby	Leicestershire	52.71°N 00.90°W	SK7414
Great Doddington	Northamptonshire	52.26°N 00.71°W	SP8864
Great Doward	Herefordshire	51.84°N 02.65°W	SO5516
Great Dunham	Norfolk	52.69°N 00.76°E	TF8714
Great Dunmow	Essex	51.86°N 00.35°E	TL6221
Great Durnford	Wiltshire	51.14°N 01.81°W	SU1338

===== Great E – Great N =====
Location	Locality	Coordinates (links to map & photo sources)	OS grid reference
Great Easton	Leicestershire	52.52°N 00.76°W	SP8493
Great Easton	Essex	51.90°N 00.33°E	TL6125
Great Eccleston	Lancashire	53.85°N 02.88°W	SD4240
Great Edstone	North Yorkshire	54.24°N 00.92°W	SE7084
Great Ellingham	Norfolk	52.53°N 00.96°E	TM0197
Great Elm	Somerset	51.23°N 02.37°W	ST7449
Great Eppleton	Sunderland	54.82°N 01.44°W	NZ3648
Great Eversden	Cambridgeshire	52.15°N 00.01°W	TL3653
Great Fencote	North Yorkshire	54.33°N 01.57°W	SE2893
Greatfield	Wiltshire	51.56°N 01.90°W	SU0785
Great Finborough	Suffolk	52.17°N 00.93°E	TM0157
Greatford	Lincolnshire	52.68°N 00.40°W	TF0811
Great Fransham	Norfolk	52.68°N 00.79°E	TF8913
Great Gaddesden	Hertfordshire	51.78°N 00.52°W	TL0211
Greatgap	Buckinghamshire	51.83°N 00.63°W	SP9416
Great Gate	Staffordshire	52.95°N 01.92°W	SK0540
Great Gidding	Cambridgeshire	52.43°N 00.36°W	TL1183
Great Givendale	East Riding of Yorkshire	53.97°N 00.76°W	SE8153
Great Glemham	Suffolk	52.19°N 01.40°E	TM3361
Great Glen	Leicestershire	52.56°N 01.04°W	SP6597
Great Gonerby	Lincolnshire	52.93°N 00.67°W	SK8938
Great Gransden	Cambridgeshire	52.17°N 00.14°W	TL2755
Great Green (Thrandeston)	Suffolk	52.35°N 01.11°E	TM1277
Great Green (Burgate)	Suffolk	52.34°N 01.03°E	TM0776
Great Green (Cockfield)	Suffolk	52.16°N 00.79°E	TL9155
Great Green	Cambridgeshire	52.07°N 00.13°W	TL2844
Great Habton	North Yorkshire	54.17°N 00.85°W	SE7576
Great Hale	Lincolnshire	52.96°N 00.30°W	TF1442
Great Hallingbury	Essex	51.84°N 00.19°E	TL5119
Greatham	Hampshire	51.06°N 00.90°W	SU7730
Greatham	West Sussex	50.92°N 00.52°W	TQ0415
Greatham	Hartlepool	54.63°N 01.24°W	NZ4927
Great Hampden	Buckinghamshire	51.70°N 00.78°W	SP8401
Great Harrowden	Northamptonshire	52.32°N 00.72°W	SP8770
Great Harwood	Lancashire	53.78°N 02.41°W	SD7332
Great Haseley	Oxfordshire	51.70°N 01.07°W	SP6401
Great Hatfield	East Riding of Yorkshire	53.86°N 00.20°W	TA1842
Great Haywood	Staffordshire	52.79°N 02.00°W	SK0022
Great Heath	Coventry	52.41°N 01.50°W	SP3480
Great Heck	North Yorkshire	53.68°N 01.10°W	SE5921
Great Henny	Essex	52.00°N 00.70°E	TL8637
Great Hinton	Wiltshire	51.33°N 02.14°W	ST9059
Great Hivings	Buckinghamshire	51.71°N 00.62°W	SP9503
Great Hockham	Norfolk	52.49°N 00.87°E	TL9592
Great Holcombe	Oxfordshire	51.65°N 01.11°W	SU6196
Great Holland	Essex	51.82°N 01.20°E	TM2119
Great Hollands	Berkshire	51.39°N 00.77°W	SU8567
Great Holm	Milton Keynes	52.03°N 00.80°W	SP8238
Great Horkesley	Essex	51.93°N 00.86°E	TL9730
Great Hormead	Hertfordshire	51.94°N 00.03°E	TL4029
Great Horton	Bradford	53.77°N 01.78°W	SE1431
Great Horwood	Buckinghamshire	51.97°N 00.88°W	SP7731
Great Houghton	Barnsley	53.54°N 01.35°W	SE4306
Great Houghton	Northamptonshire	52.21°N 00.84°W	SP7958
Great Howarth	Rochdale	53.63°N 02.15°W	SD9015
Great Hucklow	Derbyshire	53.29°N 01.74°W	SK1777
Great Job's Cross	Kent	51.03°N 00.60°E	TQ8329
Great Kelk	East Riding of Yorkshire	54.00°N 00.32°W	TA1058
Great Kendale	East Riding of Yorkshire	54.02°N 00.45°W	TA0160
Great Kimble	Buckinghamshire	51.73°N 00.81°W	SP8205
Great Kingshill	Buckinghamshire	51.67°N 00.74°W	SU8798
Great Langton	North Yorkshire	54.35°N 01.55°W	SE2996
Great Lea Common	Berkshire	51.40°N 00.98°W	SU7168
Great Leighs	Essex	51.82°N 00.49°E	TL7217
Great Lever	Bolton	53.55°N 02.42°W	SD7207
Great Limber	Lincolnshire	53.55°N 00.29°W	TA1308
Great Linford	Milton Keynes	52.07°N 00.76°W	SP8542
Great Livermere	Suffolk	52.30°N 00.75°E	TL8871
Great Longstone	Derbyshire	53.23°N 01.70°W	SK2071
Great Lumley	Durham	54.83°N 01.54°W	NZ2949
Great Lyth	Shropshire	52.65°N 02.81°W	SJ4507
Great Malgraves	Essex	51.53°N 00.39°E	TQ6684
Great Malvern	Worcestershire	52.11°N 02.32°W	SO7846
Great Maplestead	Essex	51.97°N 00.61°E	TL8034
Great Marton	Lancashire	53.79°N 03.01°W	SD3334
Great Marton Moss	Lancashire	53.77°N 03.01°W	SD3331
Great Massingham	Norfolk	52.76°N 00.65°E	TF7922
Great Milton	Oxfordshire	51.71°N 01.10°W	SP6202
Great Missenden	Buckinghamshire	51.70°N 00.71°W	SP8901
Great Mitton	Lancashire	53.83°N 02.44°W	SD7138
Great Mongeham	Kent	51.21°N 01.34°E	TR3451
Great Moor	Staffordshire	52.57°N 02.25°W	SO8398
Greatmoor	Buckinghamshire	51.89°N 00.98°W	SP7022
Great Moor	Stockport	53.38°N 02.13°W	SJ9188
Great Moulton	Norfolk	52.46°N 01.17°E	TM1690
Great Munden	Hertfordshire	51.89°N 00.03°W	TL3524
Great Musgrave	Cumbria	54.51°N 02.37°W	NY7613
Greatness	Kent	51.28°N 00.19°E	TQ5356
Great Ness	Shropshire	52.75°N 02.90°W	SJ3918
Great Notley	Essex	51.86°N 00.52°E	TL7421

===== Great O – Great Z =====
Location	Locality	Coordinates (links to map & photo sources)	OS grid reference
Great Oak	Monmouthshire	51.77°N 02.90°W	SO3809
Great Oakley	Northamptonshire	52.45°N 00.72°W	SP8785
Great Oakley	Essex	51.89°N 01.18°E	TM1927
Great Offley	Hertfordshire	51.92°N 00.34°W	TL1426
Great Orme	Conwy	53.33°N 03.87°W	SH754841
Great Ormside	Cumbria	54.54°N 02.46°W	NY7017
Great Orton	Cumbria	54.87°N 03.06°W	NY3254
Great Ouseburn	North Yorkshire	54.04°N 01.32°W	SE4461
Great Oxendon	Northamptonshire	52.44°N 00.92°W	SP7383
Great Oxney Green	Essex	51.72°N 00.40°E	TL6606
Great Parndon	Essex	51.75°N 00.07°E	TL4308
Great Pattenden	Kent	51.16°N 00.47°E	TQ7344
Great Paxton	Cambridgeshire	52.25°N 00.24°W	TL2063
Great Plumpton	Lancashire	53.79°N 02.94°W	SD3833
Great Plumstead	Norfolk	52.63°N 01.39°E	TG3010
Great Ponton	Lincolnshire	52.85°N 00.63°W	SK9230
Great Preston	Leeds	53.75°N 01.39°W	SE4029
Great Purston	Northamptonshire	52.04°N 01.25°W	SP5139
Great Raveley	Cambridgeshire	52.41°N 00.16°W	TL2581
Great Rissington	Gloucestershire	51.85°N 01.72°W	SP1917
Great Rollright	Oxfordshire	51.97°N 01.53°W	SP3231
Great Ryburgh	Norfolk	52.80°N 00.89°E	TF9527
Great Ryton	Shropshire	52.62°N 02.76°W	SJ4803
Great Saling	Essex	51.89°N 00.46°E	TL7025
Great Salkeld	Cumbria	54.71°N 02.70°W	NY5536
Great Sampford	Essex	51.98°N 00.38°E	TL6435
Great Sankey	Cheshire	53.38°N 02.64°W	SJ5788
Great Saredon	Staffordshire	52.67°N 02.07°W	SJ9508
Great Saxham	Suffolk	52.22°N 00.60°E	TL7862
Great Shefford	Berkshire	51.47°N 01.45°W	SU3875
Great Shelford	Cambridgeshire	52.14°N 00.13°E	TL4652
Great Shoddesden	Hampshire	51.23°N 01.61°W	SU2748
Great Smeaton	North Yorkshire	54.43°N 01.47°W	NZ3404
Great Snoring	Norfolk	52.86°N 00.88°E	TF9434
Great Somerford	Wiltshire	51.53°N 02.05°W	ST9682
Great Stainton	Darlington	54.58°N 01.49°W	NZ3321
Great Stambridge	Essex	51.58°N 00.74°E	TQ9091
Great Staughton	Cambridgeshire	52.26°N 00.36°W	TL1264
Great Steeping	Lincolnshire	53.15°N 00.15°E	TF4464
Great Stoke	South Gloucestershire	51.51°N 02.54°W	ST6280
Great Stonar	Kent	51.28°N 01.34°E	TR3359
Greatstone-on-Sea	Kent	50.96°N 00.96°E	TR0822
Great Stretton	Leicestershire	52.59°N 01.04°W	SK6500
Great Strickland	Cumbria	54.59°N 02.69°W	NY5522
Great Stukeley	Cambridgeshire	52.35°N 00.22°W	TL2174
Great Sturton	Lincolnshire	53.26°N 00.18°W	TF2176
Great Sutton	Shropshire	52.44°N 02.72°W	SO5183
Great Sutton	Cheshire	53.26°N 02.94°W	SJ3775
Great Swinburne	Northumberland	55.06°N 02.11°W	NY9375
Great Tew	Oxfordshire	51.95°N 01.43°W	SP3929
Great Tey	Essex	51.89°N 00.74°E	TL8925
Great Thirkleby	North Yorkshire	54.19°N 01.28°W	SE4778
Great Thurlow	Suffolk	52.12°N 00.43°E	TL6750
Great Torrington	Devon	50.95°N 04.15°W	SS4919
Great Tosson	Northumberland	55.29°N 01.97°W	NU0200
Great Totham (south)	Essex	51.76°N 00.67°E	TL8511
Great Totham (north)	Essex	51.78°N 00.69°E	TL8613
Great Tows	Lincolnshire	53.39°N 00.16°W	TF2290
Great Tree	Cornwall	50.36°N 04.44°W	SX2655
Great Urswick	Cumbria	54.15°N 03.11°W	SD2774
Great Wakering	Essex	51.54°N 00.79°E	TQ9487
Great Waldingfield	Suffolk	52.05°N 00.76°E	TL9043
Great Walsingham	Norfolk	52.89°N 00.88°E	TF9437
Great Waltham	Essex	51.79°N 00.44°E	TL6913
Great Warley	Essex	51.58°N 00.27°E	TQ5890
Great Washbourne	Gloucestershire	52.00°N 02.03°W	SO9834
Great Weeke	Devon	50.66°N 03.82°W	SX7187
Great Welnetham	Suffolk	52.19°N 00.73°E	TL8759
Great Wenham	Suffolk	52.00°N 01.01°E	TM0738
Great Whittington	Northumberland	55.02°N 02.00°W	NZ0070
Great Wigborough	Essex	51.79°N 00.84°E	TL9615
Great Wilbraham	Cambridgeshire	52.19°N 00.25°E	TL5457
Great Wilne	Derbyshire	52.86°N 01.34°W	SK4430
Great Wishford	Wiltshire	51.11°N 01.90°W	SU0735
Great Witchingham	Norfolk	52.73°N 01.10°E	TG1020
Great Witcombe	Gloucestershire	51.82°N 02.13°W	SO9114
Great Witley	Worcestershire	52.29°N 02.36°W	SO7566
Great Wolford	Warwickshire	52.00°N 01.65°W	SP2434
Greatworth	Northamptonshire	52.07°N 01.19°W	SP5542
Great Wratting	Suffolk	52.10°N 00.45°E	TL6848
Great Wymondley	Hertfordshire	51.93°N 00.24°W	TL2128
Great Wyrley	Staffordshire	52.66°N 02.01°W	SJ9907
Great Wytheford	Shropshire	52.76°N 02.63°W	SJ5719
Great Yarmouth	Norfolk	52.60°N 01.72°E	TG5207
Great Yeldham	Essex	52.01°N 00.56°E	TL7638

==== Greav ====
Location	Locality	Coordinates (links to map & photo sources)	OS grid reference
Greave	Stockport	53.41°N 02.09°W	SJ9491
Greave	Lancashire	53.70°N 02.19°W	SD8723

=== Greb-Gred ===
Location	Locality	Coordinates (links to map & photo sources)	OS grid reference
Grebby	Lincolnshire	53.19°N 00.13°E	TF4368
