= Viscount Chilston =

Title in the Peerage of the United Kingdom

Viscountcy of Chilston
- Quarterly: 1st and 4th, Argent a Man's Heart Gules ensigned with an Imperial Crown and pierced by an Arrow fesswise the pheon to the dexter proper on a Chief Azure three Mullets of the field (Douglas of Baads); 2nd and 3rd, Gules three Escallops Or within a Bordure Argent charged with eight Acorns proper (Akers)
- Creation date: 6 July 1911
- Created by: George V
- Peerage: Peerage of Great Britain
- First holder: Aretas Akers-Douglas, 1st Viscount Chilston
- Present holder: Alastair George Akers-Douglas, 4th Viscount Chilston
- Heir apparent: The Hon. Oliver Ian Akers-Douglas
- Remainder to: Heirs male of the body
- Subsidiary titles: Baron Douglas of Baads
- Status: Extant
- Seat: The Old Rectory
- Motto: SAPIENTIA ET VERITAS (Wisdom and truth)

Viscount Chilston, of Boughton Malherbe in the County of Kent, is a title in the Peerage of the United Kingdom. It was created in 1911 for the Conservative politician and former Home Secretary, Aretas Akers-Douglas. The title derives from Chilston Park, Akers-Douglas's country house in Kent. He was made Baron Douglas of Baads, in the County of Midlothian, at the same time, also in the Peerage of the United Kingdom. His son, the second Viscount, served as British Ambassador to Russia from 1933 to 1938. He was succeeded by his eldest surviving son, the third Viscount. As of 2010 the titles are held by the latter's first cousin once removed, the fourth Viscount, who succeeded in 1982. He is the grandson of the Hon. George Alexander Akers-Douglas, second son of the first Viscount.

The family seat now is The Old Rectory, near Twyford, Hampshire.

== Viscounts Chilston (1911) ==
- Aretas Akers-Douglas, 1st Viscount Chilston (1851–1926)
- Aretas Akers-Douglas, 2nd Viscount Chilston (1876–1947)
  - Hon. Aretas Akers-Douglas (1905–1940)
- Eric Alexander Akers-Douglas, 3rd Viscount Chilston (1910–1982)
- Alastair George Akers-Douglas, 4th Viscount Chilston (b. 1946)

The heir apparent is the present holder's eldest son the Hon. Oliver Ian Akers-Douglas (b. 1973)
The heir apparent's heir apparent is his son Ivo Aretas Akers-Douglas (b. 2007)
