= Listed buildings in Boughton Malherbe =

Civil Parish in Kent, England

Boughton Malherbe is a village and civil parish in the Borough of Maidstone of Kent, England It contains two grade I, two grade II* and 30 grade II listed buildings that are recorded in the National Heritage List for England.

This list is based on the information retrieved online from Historic England.

== Key ==
Grade	Criteria
I	Buildings that are of exceptional interest
II*	Particularly important buildings of more than special interest
II	Buildings that are of special interest

== Listing ==
Name	Grade	Location	Type	Completed (Note: The date given is the date used by Historic England as significant for the initial building or that of an important part in the structure's description.)	Date designated	Grid ref. (Note: The grid reference is based on the British national grid reference system, sometimes known as OSGB36, used by the Ordnance Survey.) Geo-coordinates	Notes	Entry number (Note: The "List Entry Number" is a unique number assigned to each listed building and scheduled monument by Historic England.)	Image	Wikidata
Chilston Park	I				26 April 1968	TQ8948750137; 51°13′08″N 0°42′43″E		1060856	Chilston Park More images	Q5099192
Former Coachman's Cottages About 30 Metres West of Chilston Park	II				21 October 1986	TQ8944250141; 51°13′09″N 0°42′41″E		1344313	Upload Photo	Q96278435
Stables and Mounting Block About 30 Metres North West of Chilston Park	II				26 April 1968	TQ8942350173; 51°13′10″N 0°42′40″E		1060857	Upload Photo	Q96278436
Bowley Farmhouse	II	Bowley Lane			26 April 1968	TQ8992749801; 51°12′57″N 0°43′05″E		1344314	Upload Photo	Q26628047
Hazelwood	II	Bowley Lane			21 October 1986	TQ8966249273; 51°12′40″N 0°42′50″E		1060858	Upload Photo	Q26314013
Boughton Place	I	Church Road, Grafty Green, ME17 2BD			20 October 1952	TQ8819449629; 51°12′53″N 0°41′36″E		1060859	Boughton Place More images	Q4949435
Church of St Nicholas	II*	Church Road, Grafty Green			26 April 1968	TQ8822849553; 51°12′51″N 0°41′37″E		1060861	Church of St Nicholas More images	Q17545026
Former Oasthouse About 12 Metres East South East of Boughton Place	II	Church Road, Grafty Green			21 October 1986	TQ8824149625; 51°12′53″N 0°41′38″E		1060860	Upload Photo	Q89683662
The Cottage	II	Church Road, Grafty Green			21 October 1986	TQ8821849610; 51°12′53″N 0°41′37″E		1344315	Upload Photo	Q89683653
The Old Rectory	II	Church Road, Grafty Green			26 April 1968	TQ8838349413; 51°12′46″N 0°41′45″E		1344316	Upload Photo	Q26628048
Barn About 70 Metres East South East of Coldbridge Farmhouse	II	Coldbridge Lane			21 October 1986	TQ8860447870; 51°11′56″N 0°41′53″E		1060862	Upload Photo	Q26314014
Coldbridge Farmhouse	II	Coldbridge Lane			21 October 1986	TQ8852047889; 51°11′57″N 0°41′49″E		1076966	Upload Photo	Q26342975
Great Humphries Farmhouse	II	Coldbridge Lane			21 October 1986	TQ8703047862; 51°11′58″N 0°40′32″E		1051664	Upload Photo	Q26303508
Elmstone Farmhouse	II	Elmstone Hole Road			26 April 1968	TQ8698749836; 51°13′02″N 0°40′34″E		1336296	Upload Photo	Q26620797
Cherry Tree Cottage Lavender Cottage Rosemary Cottage	II	Headcorn Road, Grafty Green			14 December 1984	TQ8725148955; 51°12′33″N 0°40′46″E		1086114	Upload Photo	Q26375804
Dunromin Fermor Cottage Fermors Cottage	II	Headcorn Road, Grafty Green			14 December 1984	TQ8727048976; 51°12′33″N 0°40′47″E		1336298	Upload Photo	Q26620799
Liberton Cottage Liberton Hall	II	Headcorn Road, Grafty Green			18 December 1973	TQ8733849084; 51°12′37″N 0°40′50″E		1299307	Upload Photo	Q26586719
Liberton Cottage Liberton Hall	II	Headcorn Road			26 April 1968	TQ8734649079; 51°12′37″N 0°40′51″E		1344317	Upload Photo	Q26586719
Marchant Farmhouse	II	Headcorn Road, Grafty Green			14 December 1984	TQ8717748854; 51°12′30″N 0°40′42″E		1299319	Upload Photo	Q26586731
Stream Farmhouse	II	Headcorn Road, Grafty Green			14 December 1984	TQ8737249224; 51°12′41″N 0°40′52″E		1086113	Upload Photo	Q26375799
The Kings Head Public House	II	Headcorn Road			21 October 1986	TQ8730348960; 51°12′33″N 0°40′48″E		1049095	Upload Photo	Q26301149
Barn About 3.5 Metres South West of Masons Farmhouse	II	Lenham Road, Grafty Green			21 October 1986	TQ8720848738; 51°12′26″N 0°40′43″E		1373835	Upload Photo	Q26654756
Offen Farmhouse and Path Between Front Door and Lenham Road	II	Lenham Road			1 October 1971	TQ8713048658; 51°12′23″N 0°40′39″E		1344318	Upload Photo	Q26628050
Stocks House	II	Lenham Road, Grafty Green			21 October 1986	TQ8718148702; 51°12′25″N 0°40′42″E		1060864	Upload Photo	Q26314016
The Homestead	II	Lenham Road			21 October 1986	TQ8726248816; 51°12′28″N 0°40′46″E		1060863	Upload Photo	Q26314015
Tudor Cottage Wrens Nest	II	Lenham Road, Graphy Green			21 October 1986	TQ8703148598; 51°12′21″N 0°40′34″E		1060865	Upload Photo	Q26314017
Woodsden Hall	II	Lenham Road			21 October 1986	TQ8625946808; 51°11′25″N 0°39′51″E		1373841	Upload Photo	Q26654760
Ivy House Farm	II	Liverton Street			14 December 1984	TQ8734449819; 51°13′01″N 0°40′52″E		1060988	Upload Photo	Q26314127
Hazel Hill Cottage	II*	Sandway			2 February 1989	TQ8948049212; 51°12′38″N 0°42′41″E		1252611	Upload Photo	Q17545294
Little Southernden Farmhouse	II	Southernden Road			21 October 1986	TQ8641246055; 51°11′00″N 0°39′57″E		1344319	Upload Photo	Q26628052
Southernden Farmhouse	II	Southernden Road			21 October 1986	TQ8670446002; 51°10′58″N 0°40′12″E		1049085	Upload Photo	Q26301140
Wallett Court	II	Southernden Road			21 October 1986	TQ8690346125; 51°11′02″N 0°40′22″E		1060866	Upload Photo	Q26314018
Yew Tree Cottage	II	Ulcombe Road			26 April 1968	TQ8643148247; 51°12′11″N 0°40′02″E		1049054	Upload Photo	Q26301110
Judge House Farmhouse	II	Woodcock Lane			21 October 1986	TQ8722048214; 51°12′09″N 0°40′43″E		1344320	Upload Photo	Q26628053

== See also ==
- Grade I listed buildings in Kent
- Grade II* listed buildings in Kent

== Sources ==
- Newman, John (2012) [1969], Kent: West and the Weald, The Buildings of England, New Haven and London: Yale University Press, ISBN 978-0-300-18509-6
