= Alastair Akers-Douglas, 4th Viscount Chilston =

Alastair George Akers-Douglas, 4th Viscount Chilston (born 5 September 1946) is a British sound editor and film producer.

Chilston was a member of the House of Lords from 1982 to 1999.

The son of Ian Stanley Akers-Douglas and his wife Phyllis Rosemary Parsons, he was educated at Eton College and the University of Madrid.

On 10 April 1982, he succeeded as Viscount Chilston, of Boughton Malherbe, Kent, and as Baron Douglas of Baads, Midlothian.

In 1985, Chilston was the lynch pin of Tripod Films of Wardour Street, Soho.

On 5 June 1971, Chilston married Juliet Anne Lovett, a daughter of Lieut.-Colonel Nigel Lovett. They had three sons, Oliver Ian (born 1973), Alexander Hugh (born 1975), and Dominic Lovett (born 1979).

In 2003 his address was the Old Rectory, Twyford, Hampshire.
