= St Martin's Church, Burton Agnes =

Church in Burton Agnes, East Riding of Yorkshire, England

Coordinates: 54.0535°N 0.3180°W

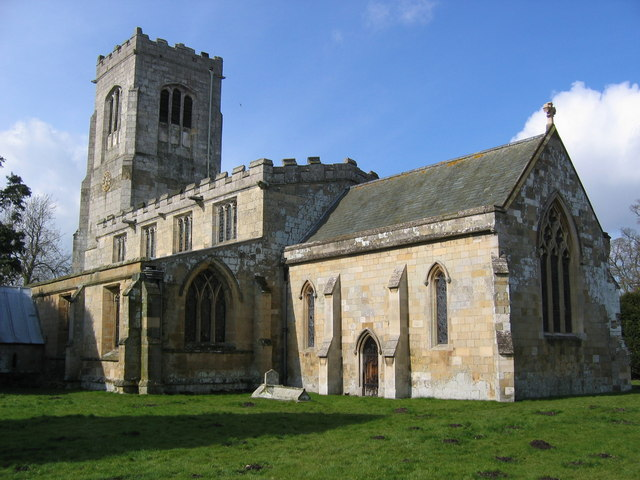
The church, in 2009

St Martin's Church is the parish church of Burton Agnes, a village in the East Riding of Yorkshire, in England.

The church was built in the 11th century, from which period parts of the nave survive. The building was first recorded in the early 12th century, and in the middle of the century, the north arcade was added. A north chantry was built in 1313, followed in the 15th century by the tower and clerestory. Part of the building were restored in the 18th century, then much was rebuilt in 1840, when Robert Wilberforce became the vicar. The church was grade I listed in 1966.

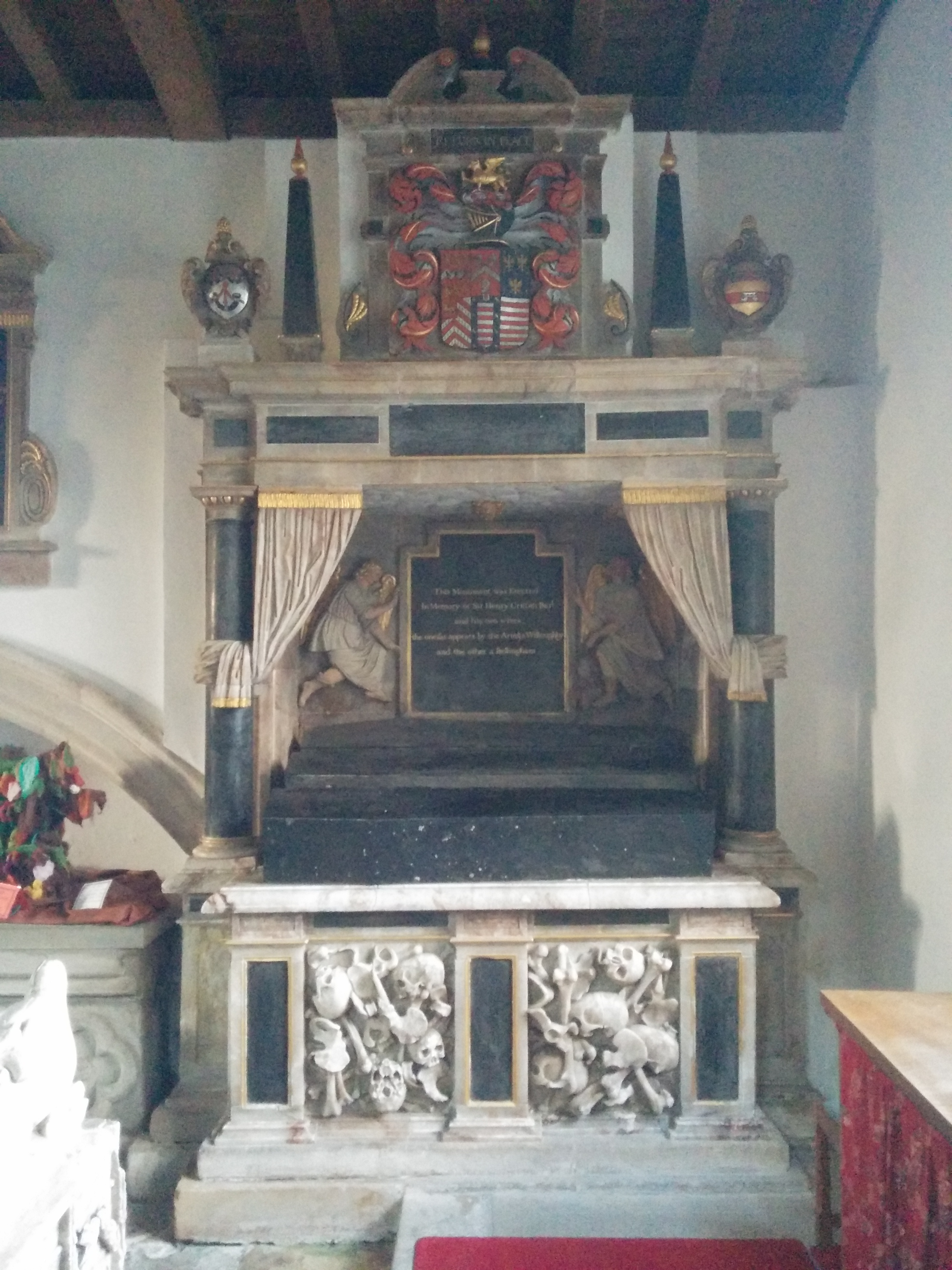
Tomb of Henry Griffiths

The church is built of magnesian limestone, the chancel is in brick, and the roof is concealed. The church consists of a nave with a clerestory, north and south aisles, a chancel, and a west tower. The tower has three stages, a plinth, diagonal buttresses, and a west doorway with a moulded surround, above which is a three-light Perpendicular window with a hood mould. On the middle stage is a two-light opening between niches with canopies. The bell openings have three stepped lights under a four-centred arch, and above is an eaves band with gargoyles, and an embattled parapet. The nave also has an embattled parapet.

Inside, there is a piscina in the chancel, and a Norman tub font which has largely been recut. The wooden pulpit dates from around 1700, and there are 18th-century box pews. There is a tomb chest depicting Roger and Maud de Somerville, dating to around 1337, a late-15th century alabaster tomb to Walter Griffith and Jane Nevill, and an elaborate wall monument to Henry Griffith, who died in 1645, and both his wives. The stained glass in the chancel was designed by William Wailes, while the south aisle has glass by Charles Eamer Kempe.

== See also ==
- Grade I listed buildings in the East Riding of Yorkshire
- Listed buildings in Burton Agnes
