= Burton Agnes Manor House =

Coordinates: 54.053420°N 0.317370°W

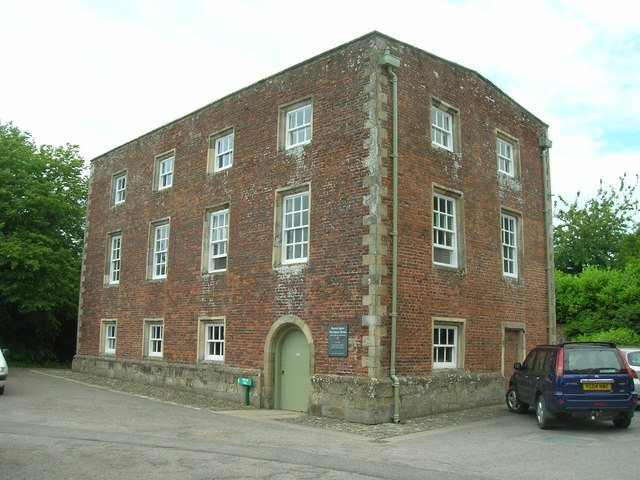
- Manor House, Burton Agnes
- Interactive map of the Burton Agnes Manor House area

General information
- Type: Manor house
- Classification: Grade I
- Location: Burton Agnes, England
- Construction started: 1170
- Construction stopped: 1180
- Owner: Boynton family

Burton Agnes Manor House is an English Heritage property, located in the village of Burton Agnes, East Riding of Yorkshire, England only a few yards away from the newer Burton Agnes Hall.

It is a surviving example of a Norman manor house with a well-preserved Norman undercroft; a hall house that was later encased in 18th-century brickwork. It is now a Grade I listed building. Much of the undercroft is built with local chalk.

It is open to the public from 11 am to 5 pm from April to October.

== History ==
The manor house was built between 1170 and 1180 by Roger de Stuteville, The manor house and village were named after his daughter. Both passed by marriage into the hands of the Somerville family in 1274 and then by marriage to the Griffith family c. 1323. A descendant, Sir Walter Griffith, is believed to have restored the hall and added the present roof in the 15th century.

In 1654 the estate passed from Sir Henry Griffith to his nephew Sir Francis Boynton, and still remains in the ownership of the Boynton family.

== Architecture ==
The house is built of pinkish-brown brick on a chamfered plinth, with dressings in magnesian limestone, quoins, a moulded cornice, and a concealed roof. There are three storeys and fronts of four and two bays. The doorway on the right bay has a chamfered round stone arch, and the windows are sashes with moulded surrounds. Inside, there are remaining Norman features.

== See also ==
- Grade I listed buildings in the East Riding of Yorkshire
- Listed buildings in Burton Agnes
