= Sandway =

Hamlet in Kent, England

Coordinates: 51.227980°N 0.698740°E

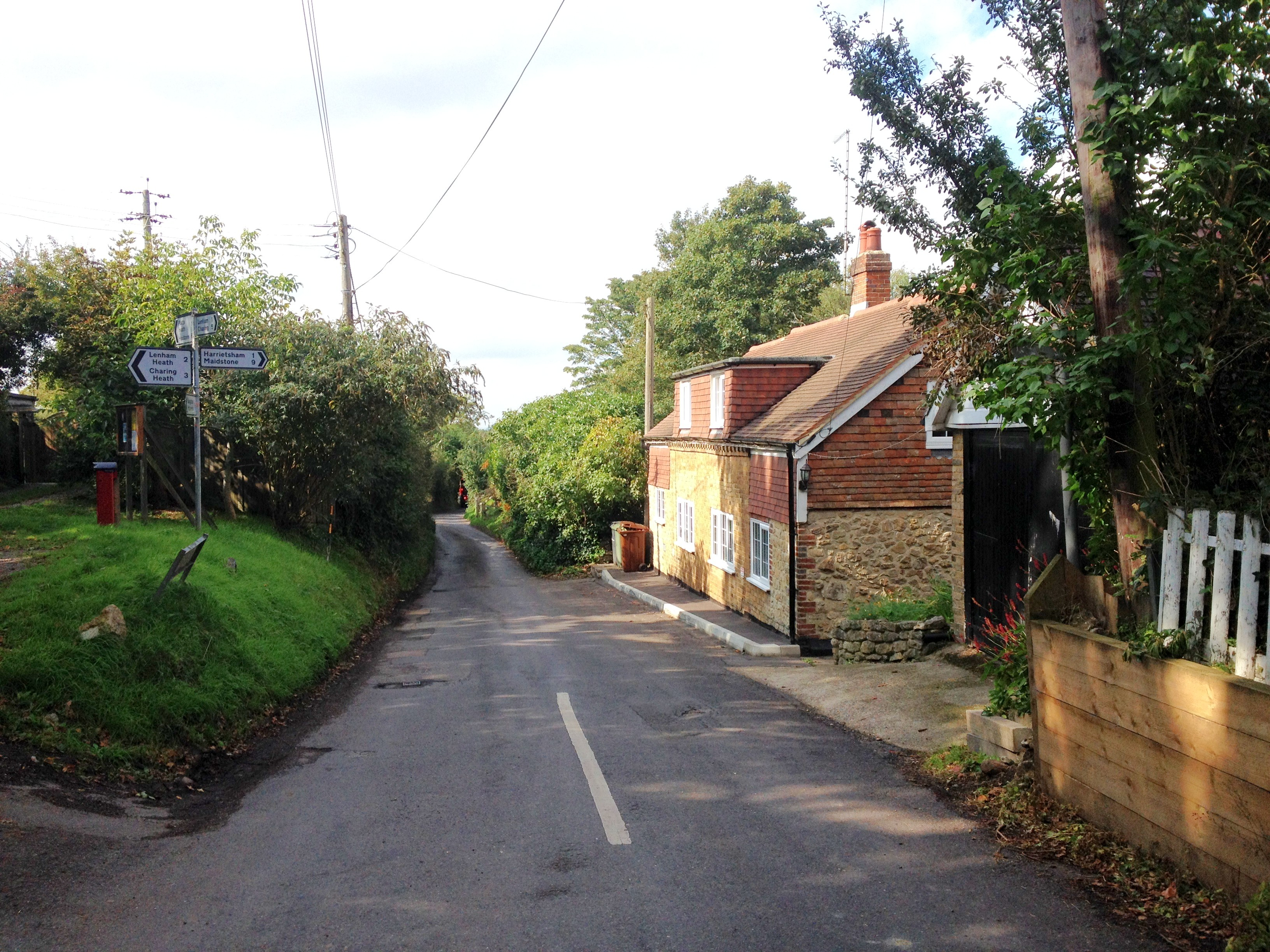
- Sandway Road, Sandway

- Location within Kent
- Civil parish: Boughton Malherbe
- District: Maidstone
- Shire county: Kent
- Region: South East
- Country: England
- Sovereign state: United Kingdom
- Post town: Maidstone
- Postcode district: ME17
- Police: Kent
- Fire: Kent
- Ambulance: South East Coast
- UK Parliament: Faversham and Mid Kent

Sandway is a hamlet about 1-mile (1.6 km) to the south-west of Lenham in the Maidstone district of Kent, England. The population is included in the civil parish of Boughton Malherbe.
