= Listed buildings in Burton Agnes =

Burton Agnes is a civil parish in the county of the East Riding of Yorkshire, England. It contains 27 listed buildings that are recorded in the National Heritage List for England. Of these, five are listed at Grade I, the highest of the three grades, and the others are at Grade II, the lowest grade. The parish contains the village of Burton Agnes and the hamlet of Thornholme, and the surrounding countryside. The most important building in the parish is the country house Burton Agnes Hall, which is listed, together with associated structures, including its gatehouse, and statues in the grounds. The other listed buildings include a church, its former vicarage, houses, farmhouses and farm buildings, a former chapel, and a former railway station and associated structures.

== Key ==
Grade	Criteria
I	Buildings of exceptional interest, sometimes considered to be internationally important
II	Buildings of national importance and special interest

== Buildings ==
Name and location	Photograph	Date	Notes	Grade
St Martin's Church; 54.05353°N 0.31803°W		11th century	The church has been altered and extended though the centuries. It is built in magnesian limestone, the chancel is in brick, and the roof is concealed. The church consists of a nave with a clerestory, north and south aisles, a chancel, and a west tower. The tower has three stages, a plinth, diagonal buttresses, and a west doorway with a moulded surround, above which is a three-light Perpendicular window with a hood mould. On the middle stage is a two-light opening between niches with canopies. The bell openings have three stepped lights under a four-centred arch, and above is an eaves band with gargoyles, and an embattled parapet. The nave also has an embattled parapet.	I
Burton Agnes Manor House; 54.05348°N 0.31742°W		c. 1170–80	The manor house, which has been altered through the centuries, is in pinkish-brown brick on a chamfered plinth, with dressings in magnesian limestone, quoins, a moulded cornice, and a concealed roof. There are three storeys and fronts of four and two bays. The doorway on the right bay has a chamfered round stone arch, and the windows are sashes with moulded surrounds. Inside, there are remaining Norman features.	I
Treadmill and bakery remains and wall, Burton Agnes Hall; 54.05355°N 0.31751°W	—	c. 1600	Parts of the walls of the treadmill and bakery remain, and are in pinkish-orange brick with stone dressings and pantile roofs. The openings have moulded architraves. Inside the treadmill is a partly restored treadmill wheel. The attached wall has a stone plinth and rubbed brick bell-shaped copings.	I
Burton Agnes Hall; 54.05364°N 0.31673°W		1601–10	A country house in Jacobean style. It is in pinkish-orange brick on a moulded stone plinth, with stone dressings, quoins, and a Welsh slate roof. There is a square plan with a central courtyard. The south front has three storeys and attics, and eight bays. The third and sixth bays project, and the outer bays project further with gables and three-storey bow windows. The middle two bays are gabled, and in front are five steps flanked by goats with shields on plinths. The entrance is on the right return of the third bay, which contains columns of a different style on each floor.	I
Gatehouse, walls and gate piers, Burton Agnes Hall; 54.05275°N 0.31605°W		c. 1610	The gatehouse is in pinkish-red brick on a chamfered plinth, with stone dressings and lead roofs. It consists of a range of three storeys and three bays, flanked by four-storey octagonal turrets. In the centre is a round-arched carriage entrance with moulded imposts, a keystone with the figure of an angel, and flanking caryatids. Above is a plain frieze, and a frieze containing carved achievements flanked by pilasters carved with figures. Outside the entrance are paired stone arches with a chamfered cornice, above which are two-light mullioned windows, and at the top is an embattled parapet. The turrets have quoins, two-light mullioned windows, and ogee roofs with finials. Extending from the front of the gatehouse are walls, the eastern wall with a gateway flanked by piers surmounted by lions rampant holding wrought iron lances.	I
Walls and gate piers to walled garden, Burton Agnes Hall; 54.05364°N 0.31497°W	—	c. 1610	The walls enclosing the walled garden are in pinkish-orange brick with stone dressings, mainly on a moulded plinth, with a dentilled cornice and rubbed brick copings. The north wall has two entrances with wrought iron gates, one flat-headed, and the other with a cambered head between square gate piers with pyramidal finials. To the west is a blocked elliptical-headed opening.	II
Walls, gate piers, mounting blocks and dog kennel, Burton Agnes Hall; 54.05336°N 0.31730°W		Early 17th century	The walls are in pinkish-red brick on a plinth, with a dentilled cornice, and brick and stone copings. At the entrance to the stable yard are gate piers on moulded stone plinths, with moulded cornices and pineapple finials, and between are wrought iron gates. The wall to the south of the Manor House has two pairs of gate piers, one with ball finals, and the other with winged eagles. There are two mounting blocks with three and five steps, between which is an ornamental dog kennel dated 1859.	II
Barn, Stud Farmhouse; 54.04350°N 0.29520°W	—	Mid-18th century	The barn is in pinkish-brown brick, with a stepped eaves band, and a pantile roof with brick coped gables and kneelers, and tumbled-in brickwork on the gable ends. There is one tall storey and three bays. The barn contains a central segmental arch, inserted openings, blocked vents, and a pitching door on the gable end.	II
Figure of angel with horn, Burton Agnes Hall; 54.05378°N 0.31592°W	—	Mid-18th century (probable)	The statue in the water garden to the east of the house is in lead, on a stone plinth with a moulded base and cornice. The statue depicts a naked figure standing on the right leg, holding a horn in the left hand and with a staff in the right hand.	II
Sundial, Burton Agnes Hall; 54.05415°N 0.31612°W	—	18th century	The sundial in the garden to the northeast of the hall Is in stone, it has a circular plan and is about 1 metre (3 ft 3 in) in height. It has a stepped plinth supporting a column with a moulded cornice, a dial and a bronze gnomon.	II
Statue of a peasant boy, Burton Agnes Hall; 54.05312°N 0.31673°W	—	Mid-18th century (probable)	The statue in the garden to the south of the house is in lead, on a stone plinth with a moulded base, panelled sides and a cornice. The statue depicts a boy in peasant dress, standing with his legs crossed and holding a shepherd's crook, wearing breeches, a shirt, a coat and a hat.	II
Statue of a peasant girl, Burton Agnes Hall; 54.05326°N 0.31621°W	—	Mid-18th century (probable)	The statue in the garden to the south of the house is in lead, on a stone plinth with a moulded base, panelled sides and a cornice. The statue depicts a girl in peasant dress with fruit in her apron, carrying a basket and wearing a hat.	II
Statue of a warrior, Burton Agnes Hall; 54.05300°N 0.31629°W		Mid-18th century (probable)	The statue in the garden to the south of the house is in lead, on a sandstone oblong plinth with a moulded base, panelled sides and a cornice. The statue depicts a naked warrior running forward with a sword and a shield.	II
Statue of Mercury, Burton Agnes Hall; 54.05392°N 0.31604°W	—	Mid-18th century (probable)	The statue in the water garden to the east of the house is in lead, on a square stone plinth with a moulded base and cornice. The statue depicts the winged figure of Mercury standing on his left leg, and holding a caduceus in his upheld right hand.	II
The Old Rectory; 54.05315°N 0.31865°W	—	Mid-18th century	The vicarage, later used for other purposes, is in painted and stuccoed brick on a plinth, with a modillion cornice, and hipped Welsh slate roofs. There are two storeys and five bays, the western bay projecting slightly, and rear ranges. In the centre is a Tudor arched porch with an eaves band and a low parapet, and a doorway with an architrave and a moulded hood. The windows are sashes with moulded hoods.	II
Oak Wood Farmhouse; 54.04665°N 0.29063°W	—	1764	The farmhouse is in colourwashed brick with a pantile roof. There are two storeys, three bays, and a rear outshut. The entrance is in the gable end, and the original doorway on the front is blocked and has a cambered head. The windows are sashes, those on the ground floor with cambered heads.	II
Statue of a boy with a quiver, Burton Agnes Hall; 54.05370°N 0.31755°W	—	Mid to late 18th century	The statue in the garden to the north of the house is in white marble, on a square plinth with a moulded base, fielded panels and a moulded cornice. The statue depicts a naked youth, his left arm resting on a tree stump, and his right arm behind head. A quiver of arrows is fastened to the stump.	II
Manor Farm Cottage; 54.05218°N 0.31299°W		1767	The house, later divided into two, is in colourwashed brick, with a cogged eaves band, and a pantile roof with brick kneelers and copings, and tumbled-in brickwork to the gable ends. There is a single storeys and attics, and six bays. On the front is a doorway, there are two horizontally sliding sash windows, the other windows are casements, and there are three raking roof dormers with casements.	II
Stud Farmhouse; 54.04338°N 0.29558°W	—	1771	The farmhouse, later divided into two dwellings, is in whitewashed pinkish-red brick, with a stepped eaves band, and a pantile roof with tumbled-in brickwork on the gable ends. There are two storeys and two bays, flanked by lower two-storey single-bay wings. In the centre is a porch and a doorway with a divided fanlight. The windows are a mix of casements and horizontally sliding sashes, some with cambered heads.	II
Manor Farmhouse; 54.05803°N 0.29736°W		Late 18th century (probable)	The farmhouse is in colourwashed brick, with a dentiled eaves cornice, and a swept tile roof with brick copings, and tumbled-in brickwork to the gable end. There are two storeys, and a double depth plan, three bays, and a single storey two-bay extension with attics to the right. On the front is a projecting porch with decorative pilasters, a fanlight and a hood. The windows on the front are sashes with channelled wedge lintels and keystones. The windows on the extension are horizontally sliding sashes, and there is a raking roof dormer.	II
Church Farmhouse; 54.05293°N 0.31794°W		Early 19th century	The house, later divided into two, is in colourwashed brick, with stepped eaves and a pantile roof. There are two storeys and three bays, and a rear outshut. On the front is a doorway and horizontally sliding sash windows, the ground floor openings with cambered heads.	II
Home Farmhouse; 54.05262°N 0.31443°W	—	Early 19th century (probable)	The farmhouse is in pinkish-brown brick with a hipped pantile roof. There are two storeys and three bays. The central doorway has a moulded surround, and a blind fanlight with decorative tracery, and a hood. The windows are sashes with flat brick arches.	II
Former holding sheds, Burton Agnes railway station 54.04586°N 0.30913°W	—	1846	The sheds, later used for other purposes, were designed for the North Eastern Railway by G. T. Andrews. They are in pinkish-brown brick, with red brick dressings, overhanging eaves, and a Welsh slate roof. There are two storeys and three bays, the middle bay projecting and gabled with a hoist, and a single-storey five-bay range on the left. The openings include doorways and windows, and on the gable end is an oculus with a gauged red brick surround.	II
Station House, Burton Agnes railway station 54.04554°N 0.30959°W		1846	The stationmaster's house and waiting room, later a private house, were designed for the North Eastern Railway by G. T. Andrews. The building is in brown brick on a plinth, with dressings in stone and red brick, sill bands, and a Welsh slate roof with overhanging eaves. There are two storeys and three bays, and a projecting single-storey single-bay former waiting room on the front. The doorway to the house has a flat red brick arch. The waiting room entrance has stone pilasters, a round arch, a keystone, a cornice and a blocking course. The windows are sashes under flat red brick arches.	II
Former Methodist Chapel; 54.05175°N 0.31389°W		1857	The chapel, later converted for residential use, is in colourwashed pinkish-brown brick with stone dressings and a tile roof. There is a single tall storey, and three bays. The central doorway has a moulded surround and a hood mould, and above it is an oculus. The windows on the front and right return have pointed heads and hood moulds.	II
Stables and coach houses, Burton Agnes Hall; 54.05305°N 0.31773°W	—	1859	The building, later used for other purposes, is in reddish-orange brick, on a chamfered plinth, with stone dressings, quoins, a sill band, and a Welsh slate roof. There are two storeys, and a U-shaped plan. The main range has seven bays, the middle bay projecting and gabled, and three-bay wings. The central doorway has chamfered jambs and a moulded lintel. The gable has carved kneelers with ornate mouldings, and a ball finial. The outer bays contain round-arched windows with an impost band forming hood moulds with keystones. The wings contain segmental-arched carriage entrances.	II
Ground level signal box, Burton Agnes railway station 54.04540°N 0.30961°W		1870	The signal box, built for the North Eastern Railway, is in pinkish-orange brick on a plinth, with gault brick dressings, quoins, and a Welsh slate roof with overhanging eaves and a timber valance continuing as decorative bargeboards. There is a single storey and two bays. The entrance is in the gable end, most of the windows are horizontal sliding sashes, and there is a round-arched fixed-light window at the rear.	II
