= Burton Agnes =

Village and civil parish in the East Riding of Yorkshire, England

Coordinates: 54.051743°N 0.315993°W

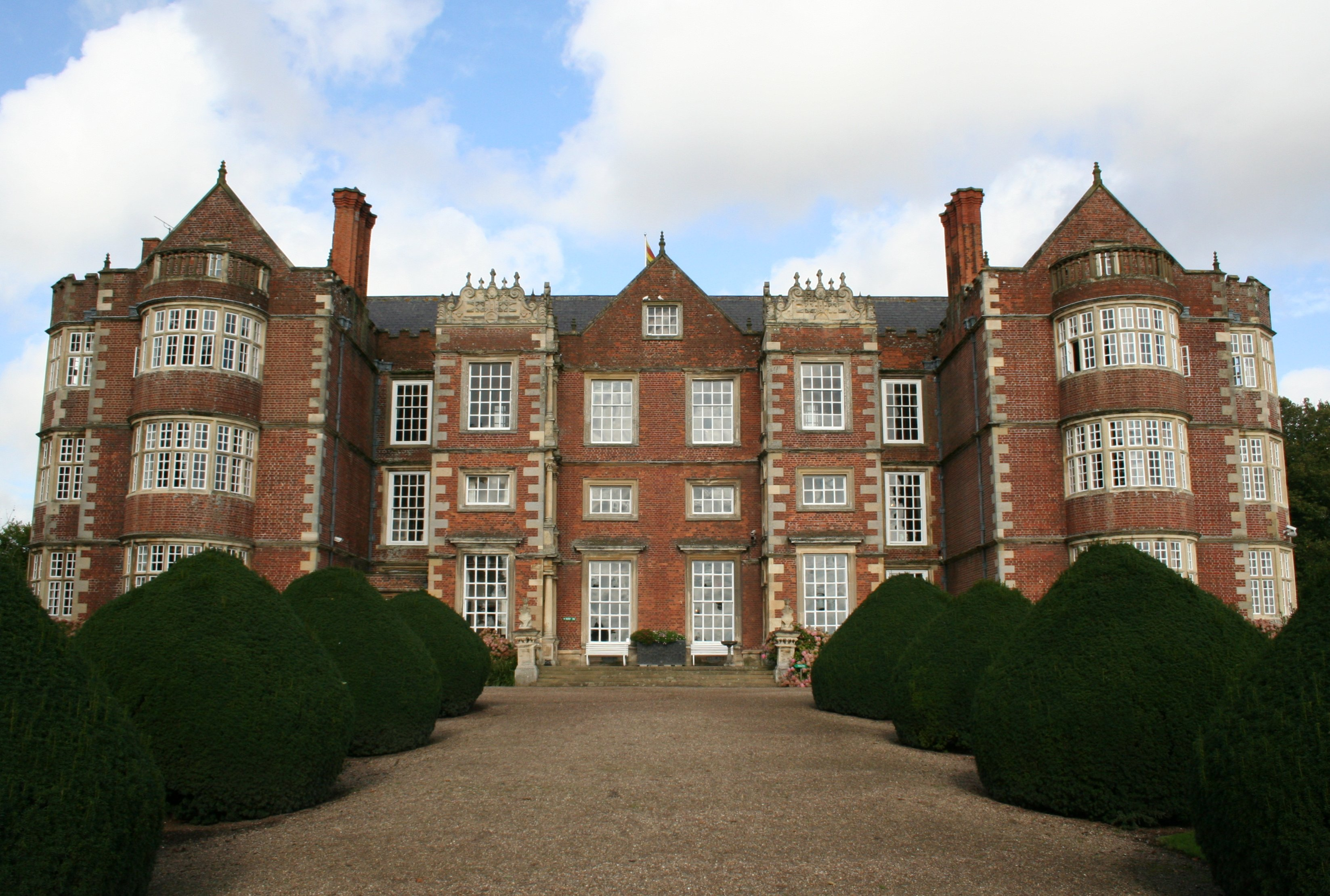
- Burton Agnes Hall

- Location within the East Riding of Yorkshire
- Population: 497 (2011 census)
- OS grid reference: TA103630
  - London: 175 mi (282 km) S
- Civil parish: Burton Agnes
- Unitary authority: East Riding of Yorkshire
- Ceremonial county: East Riding of Yorkshire
- Region: Yorkshire and the Humber
- Country: England
- Sovereign state: United Kingdom
- Post town: DRIFFIELD
- Postcode district: YO25
- Dialling code: 01262
- Police: Humberside
- Fire: Humberside
- Ambulance: Yorkshire
- UK Parliament: Bridlington and The Wolds

Burton Agnes is a village and civil parish in the East Riding of Yorkshire, England. It is situated on the A614 road midway between Driffield and Bridlington.

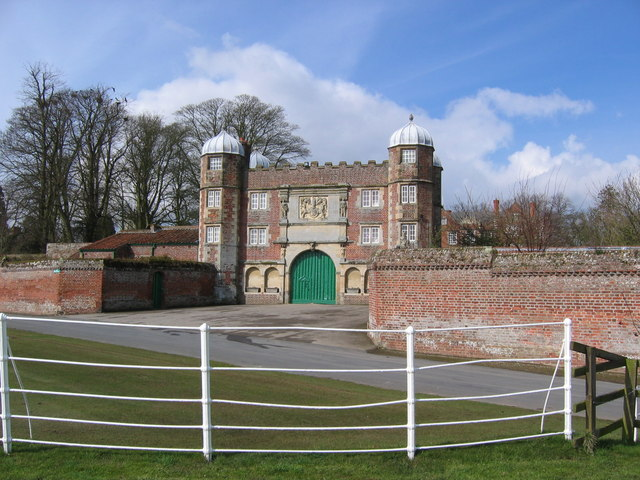
Gate House, Burton Agnes Hall, looking north to the gate and the hall beyond

Local landmarks include an Elizabethan manor house, Burton Agnes Hall, and a Norman manor house, Burton Agnes Manor House. Both buildings are recorded in the National Heritage List for England, maintained by Historic England as Grade I listed. St Martin's Church, Burton Agnes, was designated as Grade I listed in 1966.

The name Burton derives from the Old English burhtūn meaning 'settlement at the fort'. 'Agnes' derives from a local landowner from the 12th century, Agnes de Percy.

The civil parish is formed by the village of Burton Agnes and the hamlets of Gransmoor and Thornholme. According to the 2011 UK Census, Burton Agnes parish had a population of 497, an increase of one over the 2001 UK Census figure.

From the mediaeval era until the 19th century Burton Agnes was part of Dickering Wapentake. Between 1894 and 1974 Burton Agnes was a part of the Bridlington Rural District, in the East Riding of Yorkshire. Between 1974 and 1996 it was part of the Borough of North Wolds (later Borough of East Yorkshire, in the county of Humberside.

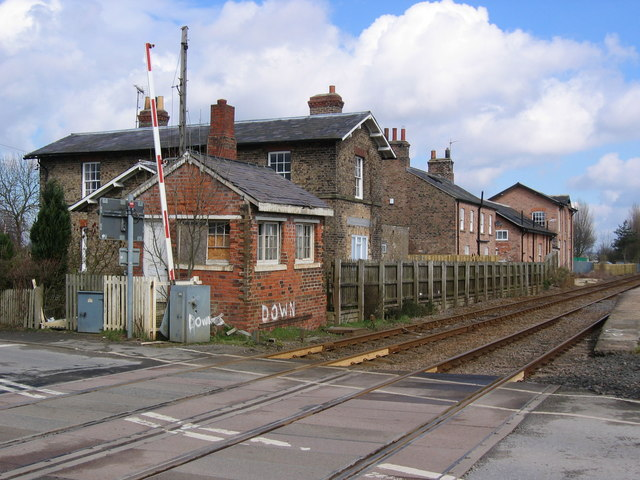
Burton Agnes Station site

Burton Agnes holds an annual Scarecrow Festival during which the village is decorated with scarecrows. The festival began in 2004 and was devised by a group of children to raise money.

Burton Agnes primary school is on Rudston Road, also on which are playing fields, close to the cemetery. The playing fields are the base for football and cricket teams. There is a small bowls field near the football pitch. Bridlington Archery Club also uses the facility.

Burton Agnes railway station on the Yorkshire Coast Line from Hull to Scarborough served the village until it closed on 5 January 1970.

On 17 September 1947 a truck carrying German prisoners of war was in collision with a train at the Burton Agnes level crossing killing two British and ten German soldiers. On 23 December 2013 a plaque was unveiled at the site of the crash in remembrance those who died.

== See also ==
- Listed buildings in Burton Agnes
