= Burton Agnes Hall =

Manor house in the East Riding of Yorkshire, England

Coordinates: 54.055354°N 0.316800°W

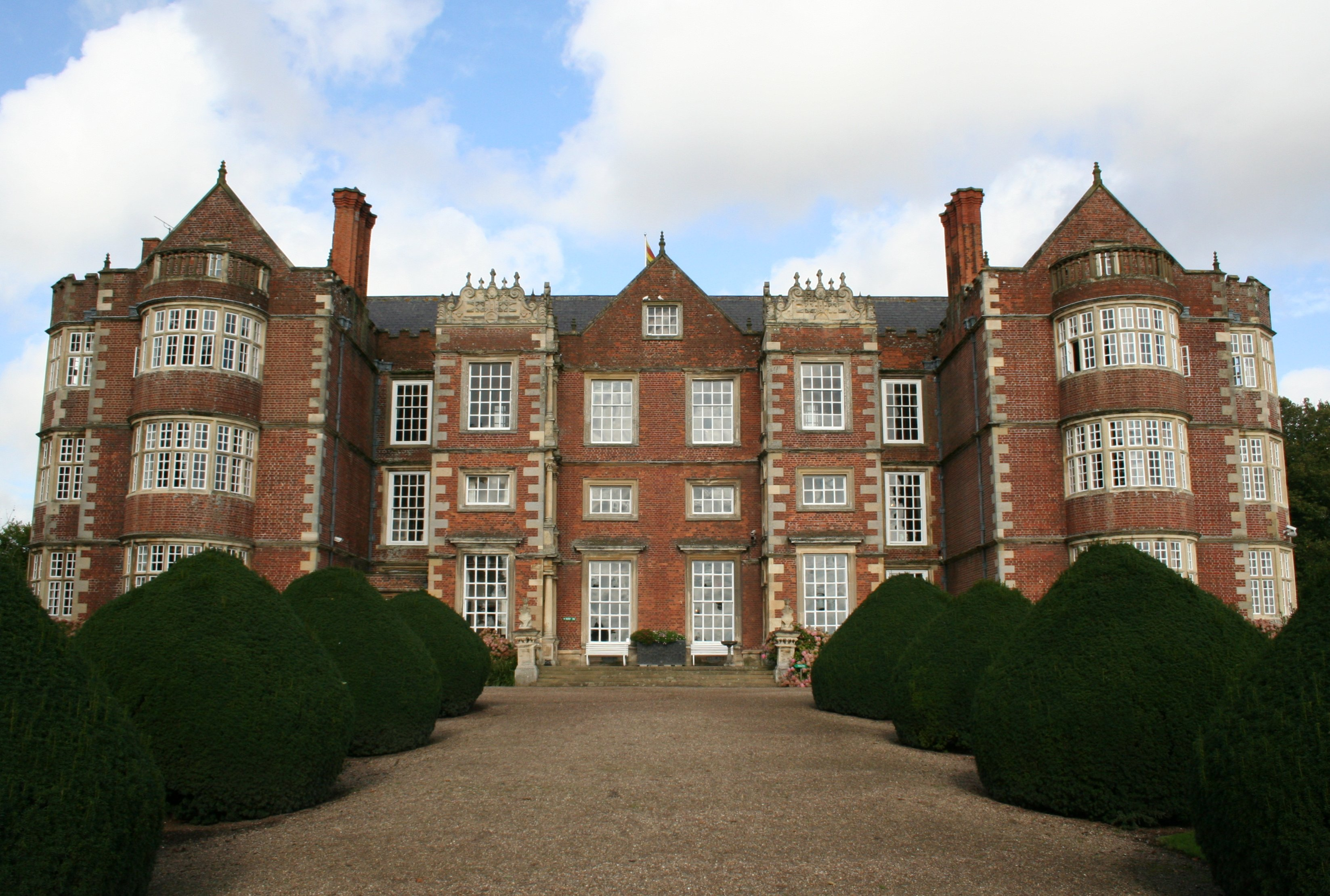
The front of Burton Agnes Hall

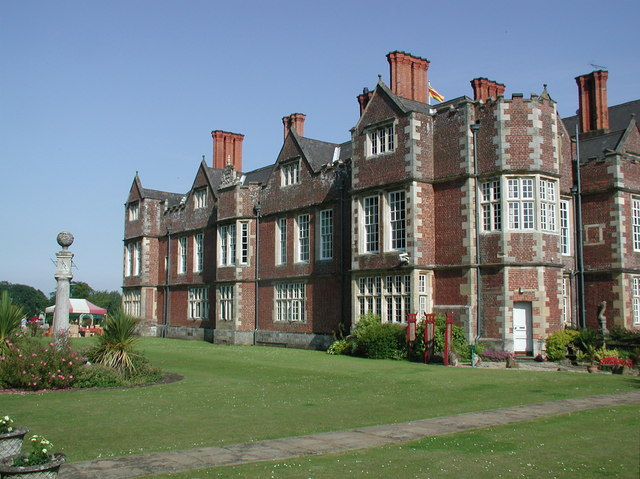
The rear elevation

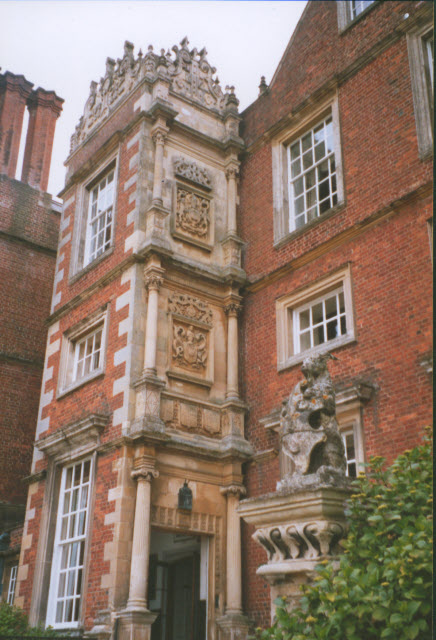
The entrance to the Porch

Burton Agnes Hall is an Elizabethan manor house in the village of Burton Agnes, near Driffield in the East Riding of Yorkshire, England. It was built by Sir Henry Griffith in 1601–10 to designs attributed to Robert Smythson. The older Norman Burton Agnes Manor House, originally built in 1173, still stands on an adjacent site; both buildings are now Grade I listed buildings.

== Description ==
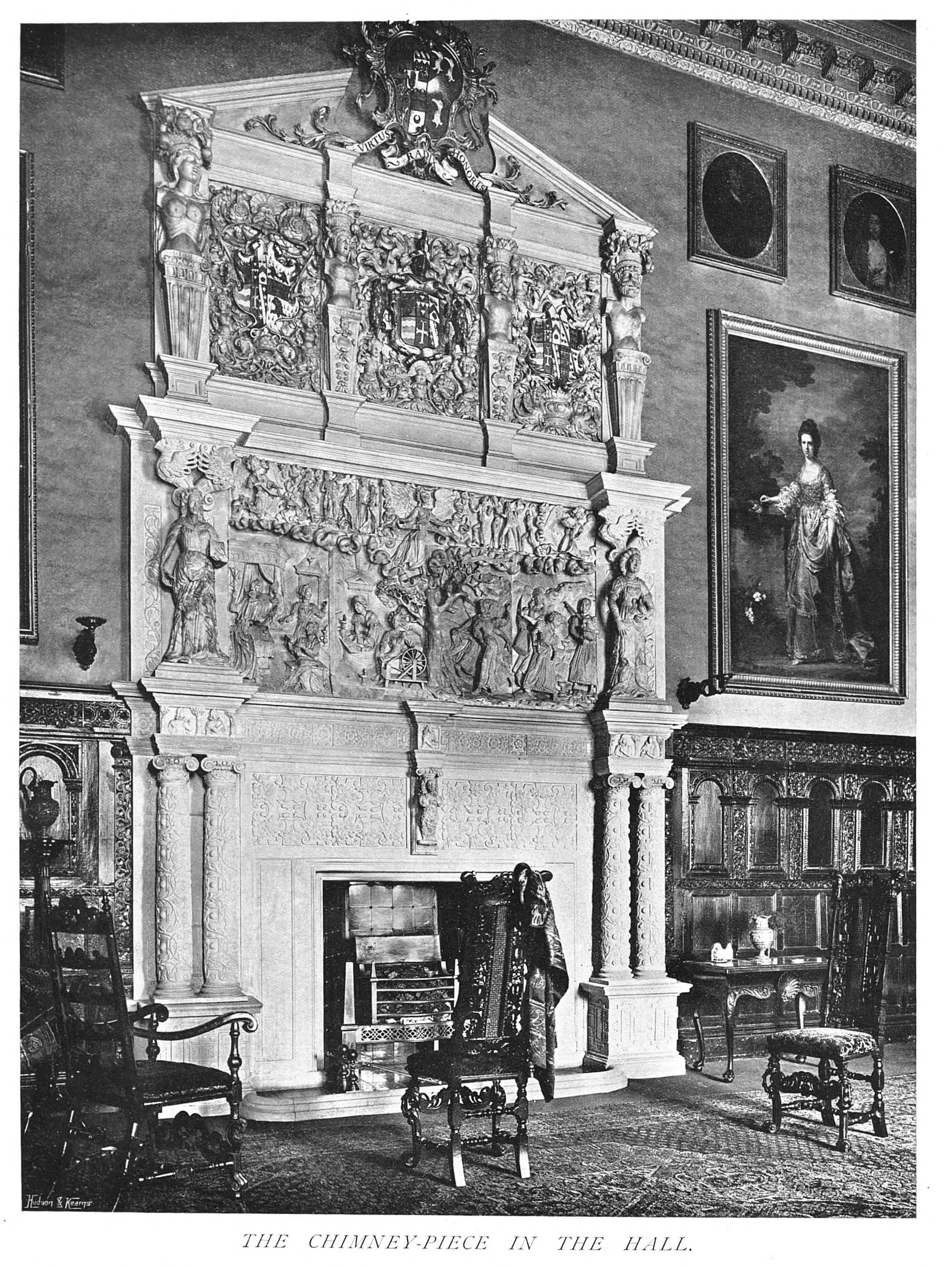
Sculpted overmantel reproducing an engraving based on Bruegel's Parable of the Ten Virgins

The plan attributed to John Smythson presents a square block with bay windows and a small internal courtyard. All of the display has been concentrated on the entrance facade, which includes many windows and many shaped projecting bays, two square flanking the central entrance, two semicircular at the ends of the projecting wings, as well as two five-sided around the corners. Variety in the skyline is created by gables alternating with level parapets. The main facade is built a storey higher than the rest of the house to contain a long gallery running the full length of the second floor, with the result that the minor side facades are asymmetric. The two square projecting bays flanking the central double bay contain the porch and the bay window at the screens end of the hall. This preserved a traditional arrangement, but with the doorway to the porch placed where it does not show, not in the front but in the side of its projection; in this way apparent symmetry is preserved.

The main rooms vary in size due to the recessions of the bay windows but the main feature of the interior is the Long Gallery, which runs the length of the main front; it is covered by a wagon-roofed, richly plastered ceiling. The "great chamber." now divided into two, was placed on the first floor above the parlour. Even though the house has been through many renovations, a great deal of 17th-century fittings still remain such as carved woodwork, plaster and alabaster. These include a number of 17th-century plaster ceilings and an alabaster overmantel depicting the parable of the Ten Virgins based on a work by Pieter Bruegel the Elder that was disseminated through engravings by Philip Galle, printed in the 1560s by Hieronymus Cock in Antwerp. The ceiling of the Long Gallery was restored in two stages by Francis Johnson between 1951 and 1974.

Robert Smythson heavily influenced Burton Agnes Hall, however comparing the Smythson plan with the house as built it is clear there are several differences. In the plan all four of the great bay windows at the corners of the main front are five-sided but in the building two are semicircular. The central bay of the east front has dropped out, the corner bays of the north front have become square, and the whole of the west front has been much altered. Also, the door of the porch is shown in the plan frontal instead of at the side.

These variations make it impossible that the plan could be only a survey of the house. It must be at any rate the first version of an original plan produced by Smythson for Sir Henry Griffiths. It is difficult to say how far the variations in the existing house are due to second thoughts on the part of Smythson himself. how far to alterations made by the Griffiths or the masons and carpenters who actually built the house. The semicircular windows were very probably Smythson's own contributions, for such windows appear prominently in two of his other plans. But it is possible that he planned a house with a level parapet, and of the same height throughout, and that these features were altered or omitted by a conservative patron.

== Gardens ==
The gardens boast 3,000 plant species and include the National Collection of Campanulas. The walled flower garden has a games motif with a central chess board played on black and white paving stones. Other games include draughts, snakes and ladders and hoop toss. Each of these games is in a separate garden surrounded by plants selected by flower colours. There is also a market garden area with attractively planted seasonal vegetables. Whimsical statues abound throughout the grounds. Various artists work rotates through the grounds and galleries regularly. A woodland walk is well known locally for abundant snowdrop blooms in February.

Both the Elizabethan hall and the remains of the old Grade I listed manor house are open to the public throughout the year.

== History ==
The estate has been in the hands of the same family since Roger de Stuteville first built a manor house on the site in 1173. In 1457 Sir Walter Griffith came to live there. The Griffiths were a Welsh family who had emigrated to Staffordshire in the thirteenth century and inherited the Burton Agnes estate.

The present Elizabethan house was built nearby in 1601–10 by Sir Henry Griffith, 1st Baronet, after he was appointed to the Council of the North. His daughter Frances Griffith, heiress of the estate, married Sir Matthew Boynton, Governor of Scarborough Castle and the first Boynton baronet. On her death in 1634 the estate was bequeathed to their son Francis, later the second Baronet Boynton. According to legend, the skull of Sir Henry's youngest daughter Anne is bricked up in the Great Hall. It is reputed to be a screaming skull, and to return to the house whenever it is removed.

The widow of the 6th Baronet married John Parkhurst of Catesby Priory, Northamptonshire, known as "Handsome Jack", who squandered much of the family fortune and neglected the estate.

On the death of the eleventh Baronet in 1899 the house passed to his daughter, who had married Thomas Lamplugh Wickham, and who had adopted the additional surname of Boynton. On her death it passed in turn to their son Marcus Wickham Boynton, who operated a successful stud farm on the estate for many years and was High Sheriff of Yorkshire for 1953–54. He died in 1989 and left the property to a distant cousin, Simon Cunliffe-Lister, then aged twelve, grandson of William Whitelaw and son of the 3rd Earl of Swinton. Today, the estate is owned by the Burton Agnes Preservation Trust and is managed by Cunliffe-Lister and his mother, the Hon. Dame Susan Cunliffe Lister DCVO.

A Hall Class railway engine was named Burton Agnes Hall, and is preserved at Didcot Railway Centre.

== Ancilliary buildings ==
=== Gatehouse ===
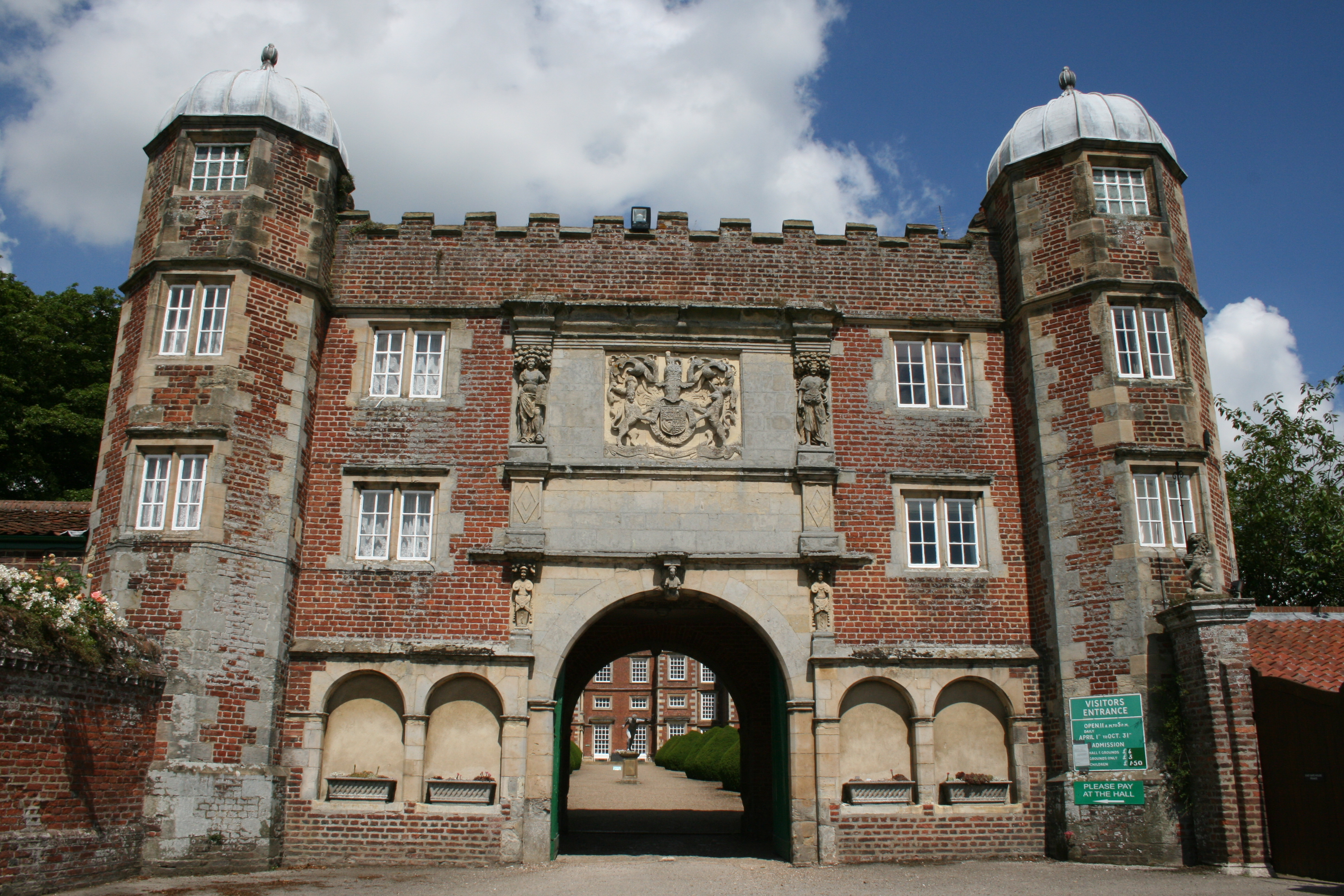
The gatehouse

The gatehouse was completed around 1610 and is a grade I listed building. It is built of pinkish-red brick on a chamfered plinth, with stone dressings and lead roofs. It consists of a range of three storeys and three bays, flanked by four-storey octagonal turrets. In the centre is a round-arched carriage entrance with moulded imposts, a keystone with the figure of an angel, and flanking caryatids. Above is a plain frieze, and a frieze containing carved achievements flanked by pilasters carved with figures. Outside the entrance are paired stone arches with a chamfered cornice, above which are two-light mullioned windows, and at the top is an embattled parapet. The turrets have quoins, two-light mullioned windows, and ogee roofs with finials. Extending from the front of the gatehouse are walls, the eastern wall with a gateway flanked by piers surmounted by lions rampant holding wrought iron lances.

=== Bakery and treadmill ===
The treadmill and bakery were built around 1600. Parts of the walls remain, and are in pinkish-orange brick with stone dressings and pantile roofs. The openings have moulded architraves. Inside the treadmill is a partly restored treadmill wheel. The attached wall has a stone plinth and rubbed brick bell-shaped copings. The surviving structure is grade I listed.

=== Stables ===
The former stables and coach houses, later used for other purposes, were completed in 1859 and are grade II listed. The building is constructed of reddish-orange brick, on a chamfered plinth, with stone dressings, quoins, a sill band, and a Welsh slate roof. There are two storeys, and a U-shaped plan. The main range has seven bays, the middle bay projecting and gabled, and three-bay wings. The central doorway has chamfered jambs and a moulded lintel. The gable has carved kneelers with ornate mouldings, and a ball finial. The outer bays contain round-arched windows with an impost band forming hood moulds with keystones. The wings contain segmental-arched carriage entrances.

== See also ==
- Grade I listed buildings in the East Riding of Yorkshire
- Listed buildings in Burton Agnes
