= Burton Agnes railway station =

Disused railway station in the East Riding of Yorkshire, England

Burton Agnes
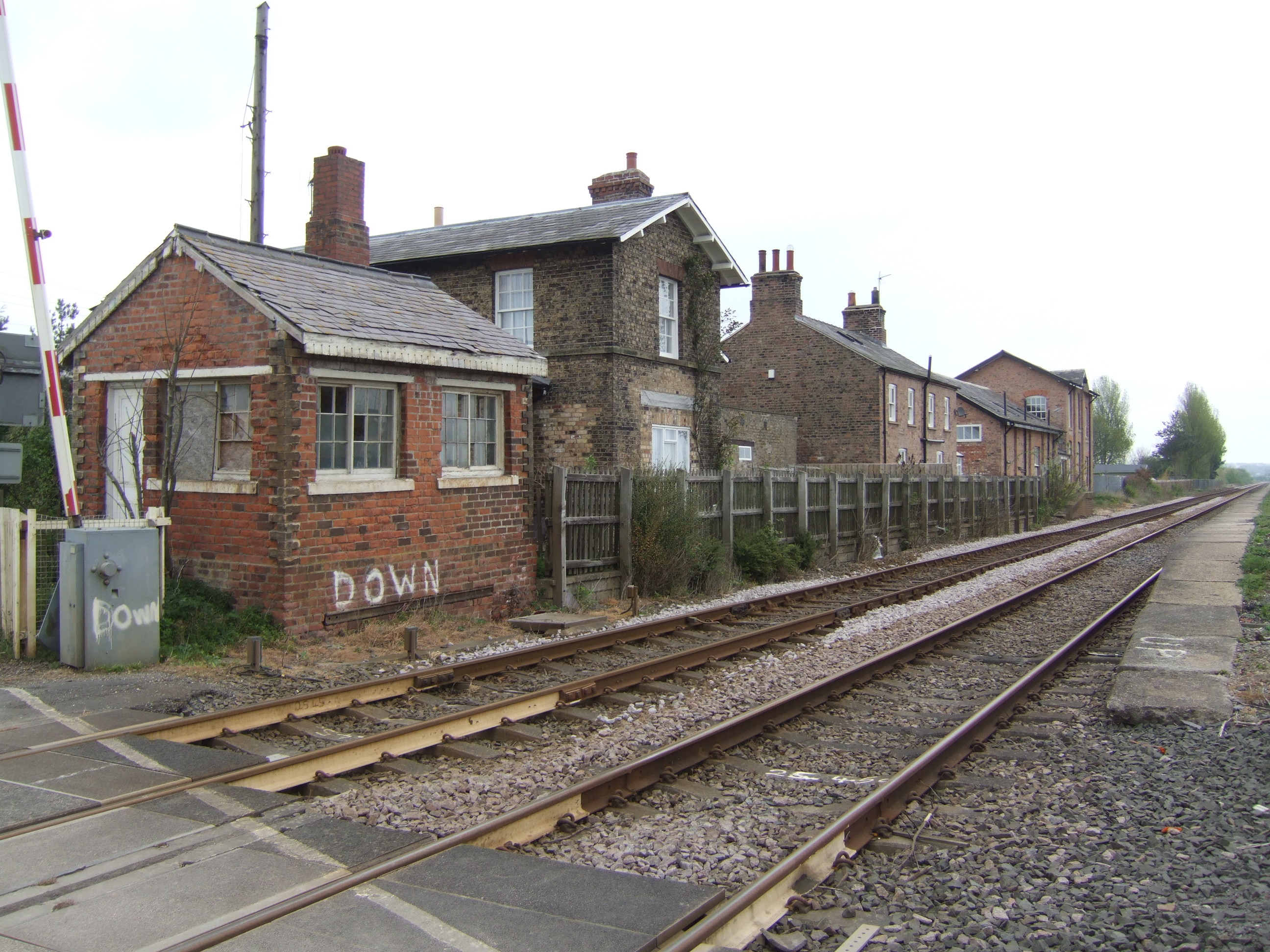
- Burton Agnes railway station in 2007

General information
- Location: Burton Agnes, East Riding of Yorkshire; England
- Coordinates: 54.0450°N 0.3080°W
- Grid reference: TA108624
- Platforms: 2

Other information
- Status: Disused

History
- Original company: York and North Midland Railway
- Pre-grouping: North Eastern Railway
- Post-grouping: London and North Eastern Railway

Key dates
- 6 October 1846: opened
- 5 January 1970: closed
Location

Burton Agnes railway station was a minor railway station serving the village of Burton Agnes on the Yorkshire Coast Line from Scarborough to Hull and was opened on 6 October 1846 by the York and North Midland Railway. It was closed to passengers on 5 January 1970, although the disused platforms, derelict signal box and station buildings all remain, the latter still used as a private house.

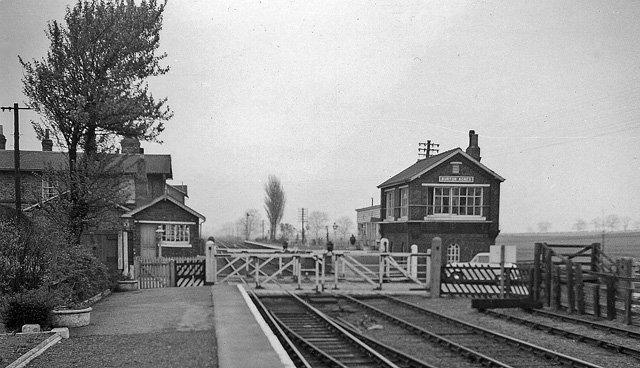
The station in 1961

== Accident ==
At 06:42 on 17 September 1947, an army lorry conveying German Prisoners of war (POWs) crashed through the level crossing gates and collided with the 05:55 passenger train from Hull to Bridlington. Two British NCOs and seven POWs were killed, with three more dying later in hospital. The accident was caused by an unauthorised driver losing control on the approach to the station level crossing and possibly the ability to press both the accelerator and brake at the same time on the Bedford three-ton truck used. The report concludes:

There can be no criticism of the railway arrangements at the crossing and it is clear that this accident, which might well have had even more serious consequences, if, for instance, the couplings of the train had not held and the derailment of the leading van had been followed by that of the coaches behind it, was due to careless handling of the lorry by an unauthorised and apparently inexperienced driver, Staff Sgt. Wadey.

== See also ==
- Listed buildings in Burton Agnes

Preceding station	Historical railways	Following station
Lowthorpe; Station closed; Line open	Y&NMR; Hull and Scarborough Line	Carnaby; Station closed; Line open
