= Thornholme =

Hamlet in the East Riding of Yorkshire, England

Coordinates: 54.057958°N 0.297713°W

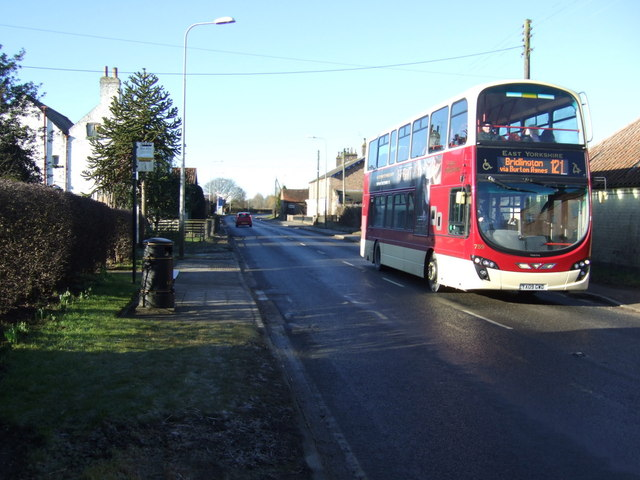
- A614 road through Thornholme

- Location within the East Riding of Yorkshire
- OS grid reference: TA115637
- Civil parish: Burton Agnes
- Unitary authority: East Riding of Yorkshire
- Ceremonial county: East Riding of Yorkshire
- Region: Yorkshire and the Humber
- Country: England
- Sovereign state: United Kingdom
- Post town: DRIFFIELD
- Postcode district: YO25
- Dialling code: 01262
- Police: Humberside
- Fire: Humberside
- Ambulance: Yorkshire
- UK Parliament: Bridlington and The Wolds

Thornholme is a hamlet and former civil parish, now in the parish of Burton Agnes, in the East Riding of Yorkshire, England. It is situated approximately 5 miles (8 km) south-west of the town of Bridlington and 1 mile (1.6 km) north-east of the village of Burton Agnes. It lies on the A614 road. In 1931 the parish had a population of 91.

== Governance ==
Thornholme was formerly a township in the parish of Burton-Agnes, in 1866 Thornholme became a civil parish, on 1 April 1935 the parish was abolished and merged with Burton Agnes.

== See also ==
- Listed buildings in Burton Agnes
