= Grafty Green =

Village in Maidstone, Kent

Coordinates: 51.2090°N 0.6796°E

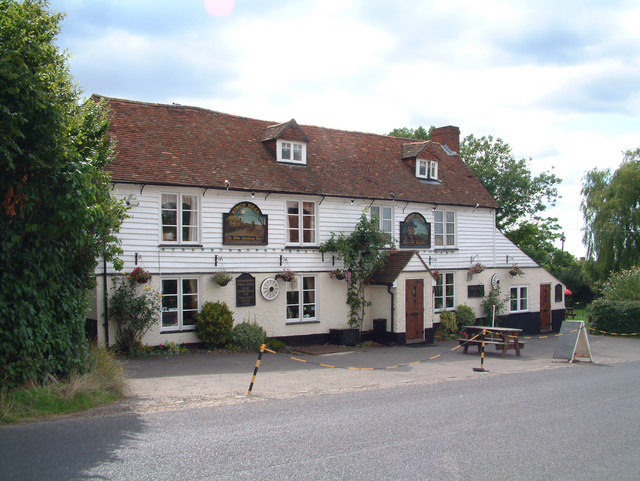
- The Kings Head Pub, Grafty Green

- Location within Kent
- District: Maidstone
- Shire county: Kent
- Region: South East
- Country: England
- Sovereign state: United Kingdom
- Post town: Maidstone
- Postcode district: ME17
- Police: Kent
- Fire: Kent
- Ambulance: South East Coast
- UK Parliament: Faversham and Mid Kent

Grafty Green is a village in the Maidstone district of Kent, England, falling within the civil parish of Boughton Malherbe. It contains two public houses. The village shop with post office closed in 2021 but was replaced with an outreach post office in the village hall. The 59 bus links Grafty Green with Maidstone on Wednesdays only.
