= Chilston Park =

Country house in Boughton Malherbe, Kent, England

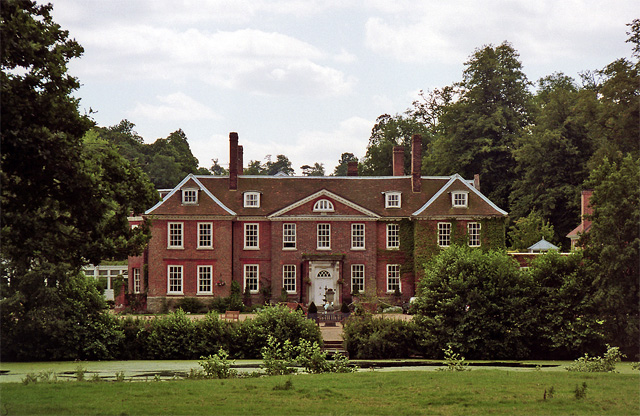
- The house from the north

- Location within Kent

General information
- Location: Boughton Malherbe, England
- Coordinates: 51.21898°N 0.711962°E

Chilston Park is a country house in Boughton Malherbe, Kent, England. Started in the 15th century, the house has been modified many times and is a Grade I listed building, currently operated as a country house hotel.

== History ==
In the early 12th century the manor of Chilston is recorded as being the property of William Fitz-Hamon. It became the property of the Hoese or Hussey family in the 13th century, who held it until 1545, when it was sold to John Parkhurst. After his descendant Sir William Parkhurst sold the manor to Richard Northwood of Thanet, it passed quickly through the possession of several owners before becoming the property of Edward Hales in 1650. Hales was a nephew of Sir Edward Hales and was briefly MP for Hythe in 1685 and 1689. He died in 1696 and his daughters sold the house in 1698 to Elizabeth Hamilton, widow of James Hamilton and mother of James Hamilton, 6th Earl of Abercorn.

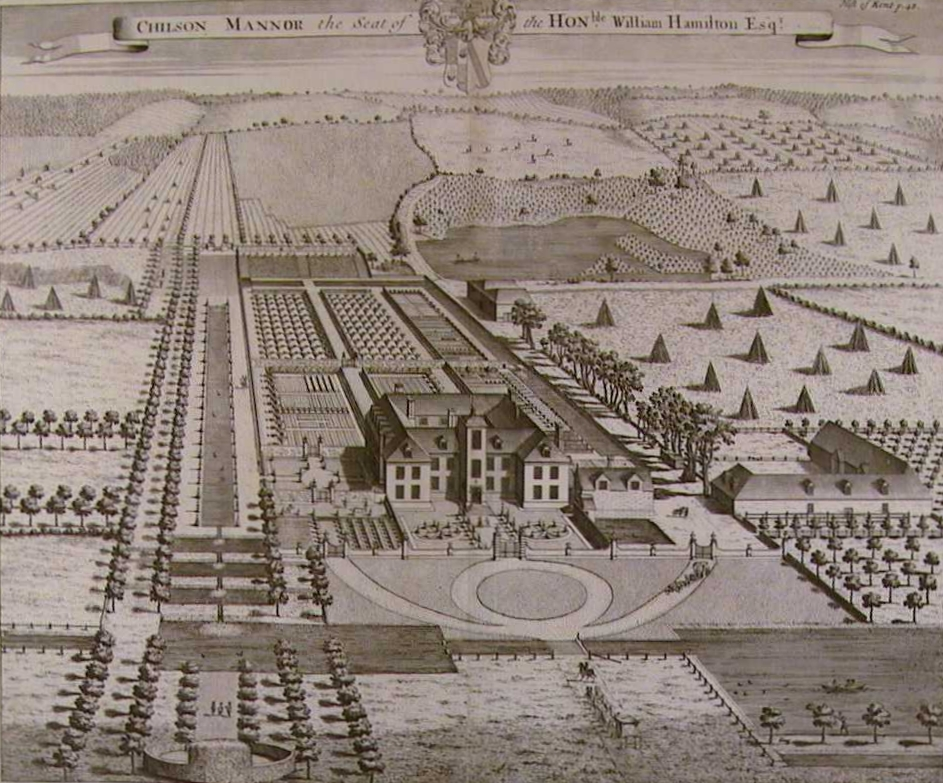
Chilson Mannor by Thomas Baderslade, 1719, showing the house from the north with extensive formal gardens

Elizabeth Hamilton died in 1709 and is buried in the church at Hollingbourne. The estate was inherited by her younger son William Hamilton, who left it on his death in 1737 to his son John Hamilton. He sold the estate to Thomas Best, MP for Canterbury (1741–54 and 1761–68). The next owner was his nephew George Best, MP for Rochester (1790–96). Following Best's death in 1819, the house was bought by George Douglas, passing to James Stoddart Douglas, MP for Rochester (1841–47), and then to a distant relative Aretas Akers in 1875.

Akers, who was MP for East Kent (1880–85) then St Augustine's (1885–1911), added Douglas to his family name. He was Home Secretary from 1902 to 1905 and, in 1911, was created Viscount Chilston. Chilston Park remained in the Akers-Douglas family until the estate was sold by the fourth viscount in 1983. Since then, the house and most of the parkland have been used as a country-house hotel.

== Buildings ==
Chilston Park house is a two-storey, red-brick building with an attic floor in the roof. It was begun in the late 15th century or early 16th century as a courtyard house and was altered in each of the subsequent three centuries. The courtyard was infilled in the 1880s and the house now forms a single block.

The symmetrical front façade to the north is nine windows wide and features two projecting side bays and a pedimented central bay with a Diocletian window. A modillioned cornice runs above the first floor and over the pediment. The central bay, which contains the entrance, was reconstructed in 1728 to replace an earlier three-storied porch. The 12-paned sash windows in this façade are replacements installed in the late 17th or early 18th century and are recessed with stone sills and rubbed brick voussoirs. The roof, hipped to the front, gabled to the rear and with dormers on each outer slope, was replaced in the same period as the front façade windows.

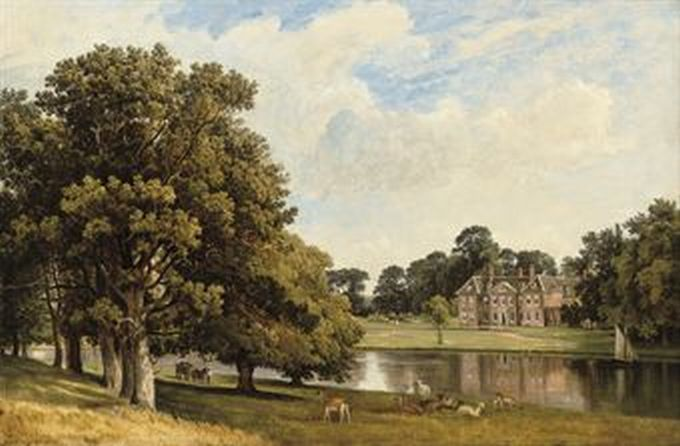
Grazing deer before Chilston Park, Kent by Frederick Richard Lee, a 19th-century view of the house across the larger of the two lakes

The modillioned cornice continues on the east façade, which is generally symmetrical about a central doorway apart a projecting bay on the north end. The south façade features gabled stone-built bays at each end with brick surrounds to the windows on each floor. The central section is built of brick in similar style to the east façade with the cornice repeated from the north and east sides. A brick conservatory with octagonal pyramidal roof projects south from the east end of the façade. The west wing was rebuilt after the Second World War.

Internally, the entrance hall is early 18th century with a black-and-white stone floor. Four rooms have moulded plaster ceilings and cornices dated to the second quarter of the 18th century. The central staircase was installed when the courtyard was enclosed and features carved panelling from circa 1540, believed to be from Royton Chapel.

To the west of the house, beyond a modern extension, is a single-storey stone-built stable from the 17th or early 18th century that was partly rebuilt in the 19th century. It flanks the north and west sides of a courtyard and part of the east side. Roofs are hipped, with an attic floor reached from an external stair. A mounting block on the east wing incorporates part of an early 16th-century fireplace with the arms of the Hussey family. To the south of the courtyard are two-storey stone-built coachman's cottages from the 18th century with brick dressings and a brick eaves cornice. The house, the stables and the mounting block are Grade I listed buildings. The coachman's cottages are listed Grade II.

== Park ==
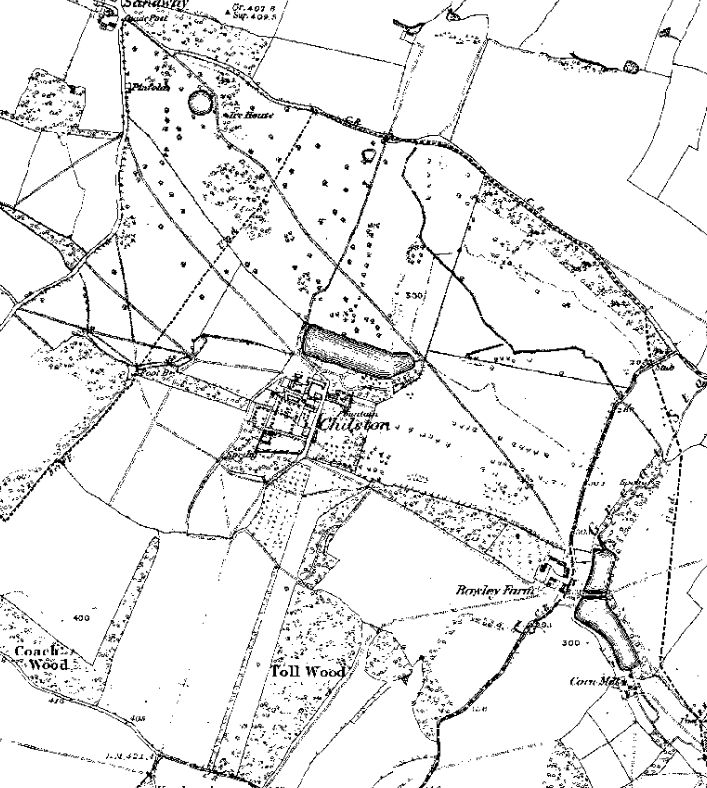
Ordnance Survey map of Chilston Park, 1876

Chilston Park house sits in 78 hectares (190 acres) of Grade II listed parkland originally enclosed in the early 18th century by John Hamilton. On the north side, 13 hectares (32 acres) containing a stand of pine trees are separated from the rest of the park by the M20 motorway and the Channel Tunnel Rail Link. To the north and south of the house are formal gardens, with a large, roughly rectangular lake located to the north of the house and a smaller one to the south. The east side of the garden is bordered by a ha-ha. A series of ponds that existed to the west of the house in the 18th century have been filled in. A circular pond and a ruined icehouse are located in the north-west of the park.

== See also ==
- Grade I listed buildings in Maidstone
