= Gransmoor =

Hamlet in the East Riding of Yorkshire, England

Coordinates: 54.018870°N 0.284732°W

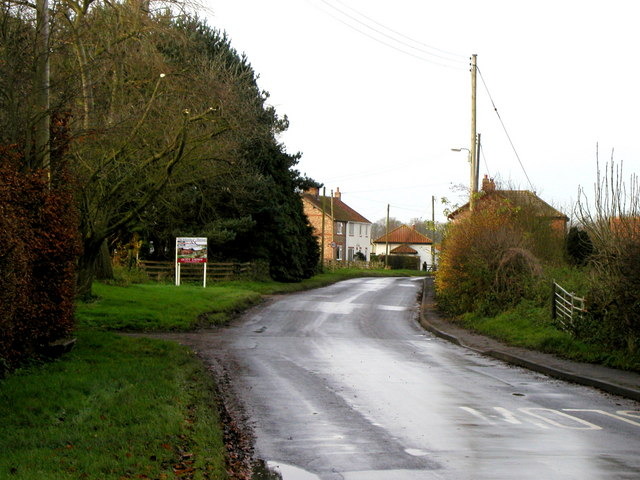
- Entering Gransmoor

- Location within the East Riding of Yorkshire
- OS grid reference: TA124594
  - London: 170 mi (270 km) S
- Civil parish: Burton Agnes
- Unitary authority: East Riding of Yorkshire
- Ceremonial county: East Riding of Yorkshire
- Region: Yorkshire and the Humber
- Country: England
- Sovereign state: United Kingdom
- Post town: DRIFFIELD
- Postcode district: YO25
- Dialling code: 01262
- Police: Humberside
- Fire: Humberside
- Ambulance: Yorkshire
- UK Parliament: Bridlington and The Wolds

Gransmoor is a hamlet and former civil parish, now in the parish of Burton Agnes, in the East Riding of Yorkshire, England. It is situated approximately 6 miles (10 km) south-west of the town of Bridlington and 3 miles (5 km) south-east of the village of Burton Agnes. In 1931 the parish had a population of 83.

In 1823 Gransmoor was in the parish of Burton Agnes and the Wapentake of Dickering. Population was 85, which included six farmers and a carrier who operated between the hamlet and Bridlington once weekly. By 1840 population was 93, again with six farmers. A chapel was built in 1839 by the owner of all 1,100 acres (4.5 km^{2}) of hamlet land.

Gransmoor was formerly a township in the parish of Burton-Agnes, from 1866 Gransmoor was a civil parish in its own right, on 1 April 1935 the parish was abolished and merged with Burton Agnes.

The name Gransmoor derives from the Old English Grantesmōr or Grentesmōr meaning 'Grante's' or 'Grente's moor'.
