= Great Tree =

Hamlet in Cornwall, England

Coordinates: 50.374°N 4.441°W

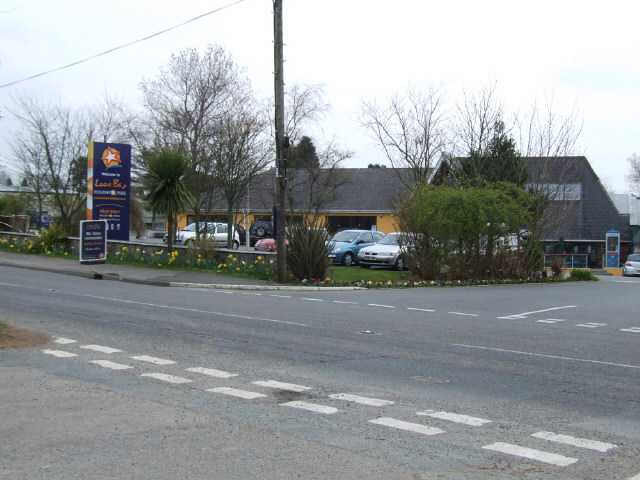

- Location within Cornwall
- Unitary authority: Cornwall
- Ceremonial county: Cornwall
- Region: South West
- Country: England
- Sovereign state: United Kingdom
- Police: Devon and Cornwall
- Fire: Cornwall
- Ambulance: South Western

Great Tree is a hamlet in southeast Cornwall, England, UK. It is situated one mile north of East Looe on the B3253 road.

Looe Bay Holiday Park, a large holiday park and campsite, is located at Great Tree.
