= Boughton Malherbe =

Village in Kent, England

Coordinates: 51.214050°N 0.693040°E

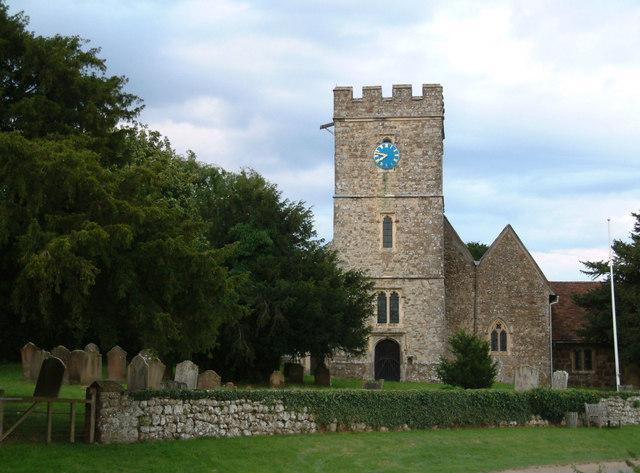
- St Nicholas Church, Boughton Malherbe

- Location within Kent
- Population: 476 (2011 Census)
- OS grid reference: TQ8849
- District: Maidstone
- Shire county: Kent
- Region: South East
- Country: England
- Sovereign state: United Kingdom
- Post town: Maidstone
- Postcode district: ME17
- Police: Kent
- Fire: Kent
- Ambulance: South East Coast
- UK Parliament: Weald of Kent
- Website: Boughton Malherbe Parish Council

Boughton Malherbe (/ˈbɔːtən ˈmælərbi/ BAW-tən MAL-ər-bee) is a village and civil parish in the Maidstone district of Kent, England, equidistant between Maidstone and Ashford. According to the 2001 census the parish had a population of 428, including Sandway and Grafty Green, increasing to 476 at the 2011 Census.

== Heritage ==
In August 2011 a hoard of more than 350 bronze weapons, tools, ornaments and other objects dating to the late Bronze Age was found in a field at Boughton Malherbe by two metal detectorists. The objects are of types that are unusual in southern Britain, but are common in northern and north-west France and therefore it is thought that the objects were made in France and later brought to southern Britain where they were subsequently buried in about 875–800 BC.

The manor of Boughton Malherbe is mentioned in the Domesday Book of 1086 as belonging to the Archbishop of Canterbury. By the reign of King John, it was held by the de Malherb family and then passed by inheritance and marriage to the Wotton family, including the Tudor courtier Sir Edward Wotton.

Boughton Place, a 16th-century manor house, was home to Sir Henry Wotton and other members of the Wotton family and was later owned by the Earls of Chesterfield and the Earls Cornwallis. Many of the Wottons are buried in the Church of St Nicholas, including Lady Katherine Wotton and her husbands, Lord Stanhope (d.1634) and Daniel O'Neill (d.1664), an Irish army officer, politician and courtier.

Aretas Akers-Douglas, 1st Viscount Chilston (1851–1926) who was a Home Secretary, lived at Chilston Park, and has a memorial stone dedicated to him in the village church.

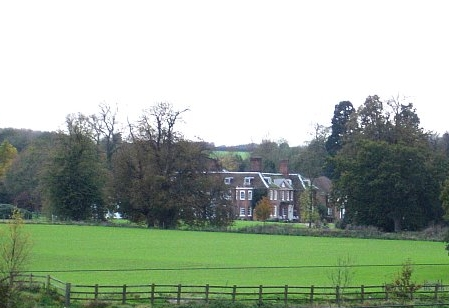
Chilston Park

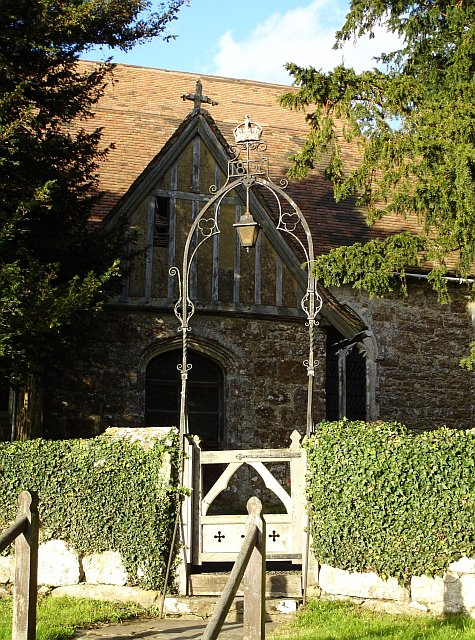
Lantern gate at Boughton Malherbe church

== See also ==
- Listed buildings in Boughton Malherbe
