= Richard Justice (composer) =

English hapsichordist and composer

Richard Justice (died November 1757) was an English composer, harpsichordist, and organist. His only surviving composition is Six Sets of Lessons for the Harpsichord which was published in London in 1757; the year he died. Each of these six pieces are written in three movements and are written in an Italian style reminiscent of the compositions of Domenico Scarlatti. The influence of Handel can also be seen in his work. He unsuccessfully competed for the post of organist at Holy Trinity Church, Hull in 1751. From 1755 until his death in November 1757 he served as the organist at St Mary's Church, Hull.
