= Listed buildings in Kingston upon Hull (Myton Ward) =

Myton Ward is a ward in the city and unitary authority of Kingston upon Hull, East Riding of Yorkshire, England. It contains about 280 listed buildings that are recorded in the National Heritage List for England. Of these, seven are listed at Grade I, the highest of the three grades, 13 are at Grade II*, the middle grade, and the others are at Grade II. The ward is the geographical, civic and commercial centre of the city. The listed buildings include civic buildings, houses and associated structures, shops, offices and bank buildings, hotels and public houses, churches and associated structures, warehouses, bridges, docks and associated structures, statues, telephone kiosks, former almshouses, buried cannons used as mooring posts, a theatre and former cinemas, former railway stations, a former brewery, former schools, shopping arcades, public toilets, war memorials, street lamps, and a mural.

== Key ==
Grade	Criteria
I	Buildings of exceptional interest, sometimes considered to be internationally important
II*	Particularly important buildings of more than special interest
II	Buildings of national importance and special interest

== Buildings ==
Name and location	Photograph	Date	Notes	Grade
Holy Trinity Church and churchyard wall 53.74186°N 0.33437°W		c. 1300–30	The church has been altered and extended through the centuries, including restorations in the 19th century by H. F. Lockwood and George Gilbert Scott. It is built in stone and medieval brick, with stone dressings and lead roofs. The church has a cruciform plan, consisting of a nave with a clerestory, north and south aisles, a south porch, north and south transepts, a chancel with aisles, vestries, a south chapel, and a tower at the crossing. The tower has two stages, with buttresses rising to pinnacles, two triple lancet windows on each side on the lower stage, clock faces, and above are pointed lancet bell openings with ogee hood moulds and pinnacles, and an openwork parapet with eight crocketed pinnacles. On the body of the church are embattled parapets, some traceried and some with openwork, and crocketed pinnacles. At the east end is a large seven-light window flanked by smaller five-light windows. The churchyard wall on the north, south and west walls is in stone, with a moulded plinth, coping and rounded corners, and it contains gateways, some with octagonal piers and cross-gabled caps.	I
St Mary's Church; 53.74384°N 0.33229°W		15th century	The church has been altered and extended through the centuries, including a restoration and extensions in 1861–63 by George Gilbert Scott. It is built in stone, and consists of a nave and a chancel with a clerestory under one roof, a north aisle, two south aisles, a south porch, a vestry and a west tower. The tower has four stages, a plinth, an archway forming a through passage, string courses, windows with hood moulds, niches with crocketed pinnacles, two-light bell openings, a quatrefoil frieze, and a traceried embattled parapet with corner turrets and corner and intermediate crocketed pinnacles. There are also crocketed pinnacles on the south aisle and the porch.	II*
5 Scale Lane; 53.74257°N 0.33168°W		Late 15th century	A house that has been much altered and used for other purposes, it has a timber framed core, later encased in brick, and rendered on the front. There are two storeys and an attic, and one gabled bay facing the street. The upper storey and the attic are jettied. On the ground floor is a bow window flanked by round-headed doorways with fanlights. The upper floor has a tripartite sash window, and on the attic is a three-light casement window. On the left return is medieval brickwork.	II
153 High Street; 53.74296°N 0.33111°W		Late 16th century	A house, later used for other purposes, with a timber framed core on a plinth, encased in brick, the rear wing rendered, with a corrugated asbestos roof and a coped gable. There are three storeys and three bays, and a rear wing. On the left is a flat-headed carriage entrance, and to the right are five narrow barred windows. The middle floor contains segmental-headed windows, and on the top floor are two-light casement windows. Inside, there is exposed timber framing.	II
Hands on History Museum; 53.74160°N 0.33548°W		1583	The building, at one time a grammar school, was converted into a museum in 1987. It is in brick, with moulded brick dressings, a moulded floor band, a lintel band, a low parapet, and a tile roof with coped gables. There are two storeys and attics, and four bays. On the front are mullioned and transomed windows. Between the ground floor windows are plaques with merchant's marks and a date, and the upper floor has a plaque with a coat of arms. Above, are three raking roof dormers. To the right is an external staircase, now covered, containing two segmental-headed doorways with hood moulds, a three-light window and slit windows.	II*
Warehouse, High Street; 53.74222°N 0.33124°W		Mid-17th century	The warehouse, which has been altered and extended through the centuries, is in brick with roofs of slate and pantile. The quayside block has four storeys and coped gables, and the central range, dating from the 18th century, has three storeys and four bays. The block with its front facing High Street dates from the late 19th century, it has two storeys and four bays, a plinth and a wooden gutter on brackets. The right bay has a doorway with loading doors above and a hoist, and to the left is a doorway with a fanlight. The windows are sashes, and all the openings on the left three bays have flat brick arches.	II
38B High Street; 53.74309°N 0.33005°W		1655	A warehouse that was rebuilt in about 1800 and later converted into flats. It is in red brick with a slate roof, and has four storeys and attics, and a river front of three bays. Each floor contains a loading doorway, and on the outer bays are sash windows with segmental brick heads. At the rear is a re-sited dated stone plaque.	II
Wilberforce House Museum; 53.74431°N 0.32991°W		c. 1656	The house was the birthplace of William Wilberforce, and was converted into a museum in 1906. It is in red brick, with dressings in moulded brick and stone, a moulded ground floor sill band, a ground floor cornice, a string course, a moulded parapet, rusticated pilasters, and pantile roofs. There are two storeys and nine bays, and two long rear wings On the front is a three-storey projecting tower porch, the upper floors with bossed-out Corinthian pilasters on pedestals. The doorway has a moulded round arched head, with imposts, decorated spandrels and a keystone, and is flanked by round-arched niches under pediments. The windows are sashes with brick and stone ornaments below them. On the front of the garden is a brick wall with a string course, rusticated panels and moulded brick coping. In the centre is a pair of gate piers with bossed-out pilasters, moulded ashlar cornices and ball finials, and between them are round-arched wrought iron gates.	I
The Old White Hart Inn; 53.74310°N 0.33364°W		c. 1660	A house, later a public house, that was remodelled in 1881, in red brick, painted on the upper floor, with a moulded string course, a modillion eaves cornice, and a pantile roof with coped gables. There are two storeys and attics, and seven bays, the three middle bay projecting slightly under an open pediment. To the left is a canted bay window, the ground floor windows are transomed, and the doorway has a round-arched head and an oval fanlight. The upper floor windows are sashes.	II*
Master's House, Charterhouse, and wall 53.74870°N 0.33271°W		1663	The oldest part of the house is the west wing, with the front dating from about 1780. The house is in brick with stone dressings, and pantile roofs with coped gables. There are two storeys, a double depth plan and a front of five bays. The central doorway has a fanlight and a pediment. The windows are sashes, those on the ground floor with flat brick arches. A long range extends to the right, and the house is flanked by concave-curved quadrant brick coped walls, each with a doorway.	II*
Crowle House; 53.74301°N 0.33075°W		1664	A house that was extended in the 18th and 19th century, adding a warehouse and office, and retaining original material. It is in brick on a stone plinth, with stone dressings and a slate roof. There are four storeys and a basement, and four bays. On the right return is a recess containing the original front of the house. This has three bays and a coped parapet. The middle bay projects and is flanked by pilasters with decorated Corinthian pilasters. The doorway has a semicircular lead hood and a fanlight. Above are two sash windows with keystones, the one on the first floor with a tympanum containing a lozenge and an inscribed device. On the lower two floors of the outer bays are recessed round arches with keystones and similar devices.	II
Minerva Lodge; 53.74188°N 0.33704°W		1698	A chapel converted into a masonic lodge in 1802, it is in brick, partly rendered, with stone dressings and a slate roof. There are two storeys and fronts of five and three bays. The front facing Dagger Lane is gabled, the ground floor projecting under a swept roof, and containing a central doorway with a fanlight. There are sash windows on each floor, and all the openings are under flat brick arches. On the left return, the left bay contains a round-arched stair window with a keystone, and an inscribed impost band. Inside, on the upper floor, is a masonic temple.	II*
Ye Olde Black Boy Public House; 53.74278°N 0.33120°W		c. 1700	The public house is in painted render on red brick, with a coped parapet and a slate roof. There are three storeys and an attic, and three bays. On the ground floor is a public house front, with a central three-light arched window, pilasters and a cornice, flanked by doorways with fanlights. On the middle floor are cross-casement windows, the top floor has two-light windows, and above is a roof dormer.	II
14 Bishop Lane; 53.74329°N 0.33232°W		Early 18th century	A house, incorporating earlier material, and later used for other purposes, in brick, rendered on the rear, with a corrugated iron roof. There are three storeys and four bays, and a two-storey rear extension. In the centre is a double doorway with a steel lintel, to its left is a shop window with pilasters and a cornice under a segmental arch. To the right is a casement window under a segmental arch, and above are four openings with segmental arches.	II
11 and 12 Savile Street; 53.74505°N 0.33911°W		Early 18th century	Two houses, later shops, in painted brick, with a tile roof and coped gables. There are three storeys and five bays. The ground floor has two 20th-century shopfronts. On the middle floor of the right shop is a three-light shop window with a fascia cornice on curved brackets, and the other windows are sashes.	II
12 Bowlalley Lane; 53.74346°N 0.33419°W		c. 1730	A house, later used for other purposes, in brick on a plinth, the ground floor rusticated, with partial rendering on the left gable and rear wing, a ground floor sill band and cornice, chamfered brick eaves and a roof of slate and tile. There are two storeys and attics, and five bays. On the right is a recessed doorway, the windows are sashes, those on the ground floor with faceted keystones, and above are five box dormers. At the rear is a two-storey stair tower and a round-headed stair window.	II
Statue of King William III and lamps 53.74111°N 0.33359°W		1734	The statue in Market Place is in gilt, it is by Peter Scheemakers, and the lamps were added in the late 19th century. The statue depicts King William III on horseback in Roman dress. It stands on a rectangular pedestal with a cornice and an iron guard rail. On the front is an inscription, and under this is a drinking fountain. This all stands on a stepped oval base with four cast iron globe lamps on pedestals with plinths and cornices.	I
Bayles House; 53.74265°N 0.33065°W		Early to mid-18th century	A house and office in brick with slate roofs and an L-shaped plan. There are two storeys, an attic and a small basement, and a front of five bays. In the centre is a doorway with a moulded and reeded surround with rosettes, a cast iron cobweb fanlight, and a gauged brick lintel with a stone keystone, and to the left is a canted bay window. Above the doorway is a canted oriel window, and the other bays contain sash windows. At the rear is a Venetian stair window.	II
Maisters House; 53.74358°N 0.33091°W		1743–75	The house was designed by Joseph Page to replace a previous house on the site destroyed by fire. It is in brick on a plinth, with stone dressings, a floor band, an eaves band, a parapet and an asphalt roof. There are three storeys and five bays. In the centre are steps with wrought iron balustrades, leading to a doorway with Ionic pilasters, an entablature and a pediment. The windows are sashes with flat brick arches. Inside there is impressive plasterwork by Page, and a three-storey staircase, with balustrades by Robert Bakewell.	I
Pease Court; 53.74482°N 0.32881°W		1745	Two warehouses, later converted for residential use, in brick, with stone dressings, a low coped parapet, and pantile roofs. There are four storeys and 13 bays. Most of the windows are segmental-headed two-light casements. On the river front, two bays contain a round-arched recess rising through three floors, with panels and windows, dated imposts and an initialled keystone.	II
10, 10A, and 11–13 Bishop Lane; 53.74323°N 0.33205°W		c. 1750	A terrace of four brick houses with stone dressings, wooden gutters and brackets, and a pantile roof. There are three storeys, and each house has four bays. All the houses have a doorway with an eared architrave, a divided fanlight and a dentilled pediment. The windows have corbelled sills, in the lower two floors they are sashes with flat brick arches and triple keystones, and on the top floor they are tilting casements.	II
13 George Street; 53.74581°N 0.33832°W		Mid-18th century	A house, at one time a shop, in brick stuccoed on the front, with dentilled wooden eaves, and a pantile roof. There are three storeys and two bays. The doorway on the right has a fanlight, the windows are sashes, and all the openings have lintels and keystones.	II
2 Bishop Lane; 53.74308°N 0.33131°W		Mid-18th century	The house is in brick, partly painted, with moulded wooden eaves, gutter and brackets, and a pantile roof. There are three storeys and attics, and three bays. On the right bay is a doorway with a fanlight, the middle bay contains a doorway with a window above, and the left bay has a window. All the windows have corbelled sills, in the lower two floors they are sashes, on the top floor they are top-hung casements, and there is a box dormer above.	II
27–28 Silver Street; 53.74296°N 0.33349°W		18th century	Two houses that were extended to the south in the 19th century with the addition of two shops facing the street. These are in brick, stuccoed on the front, rendered at the rear, with quoins, a decorated first floor cornice, a moulded string course, moulded eaves on scrolled brackets, and a slate roof. There are three storeys, attics and a basement, and a front of four bays, with rear extensions. On the ground floor are two shopfronts, the right with pilasters containing highly detailed carvings, and with ball finials, and the left plainer with a passage entry to the left. The upper floors contain windows, mainly sashes, with moulded surrounds, those on the middle floor with pediments on scrolled brackets.	II
George Hotel; 53.74323°N 0.33441°W		Mid-18th century	The public house, which was refronted in about 1870, has a stuccoed front and dressings, a plinth, rusticated quoins on the ground floor, a sill band, a wooden gutter, and a hipped pantile roof. There are three storeys and seven bays. On the left is a square-headed carriage entrance, on the right bay is a doorway, and between them are cross-casement windows with louvred shutters. The upper floors contain sash windows, the right five windows on the middle floor with moulded arched surrounds. On the top floor the windows have keystones and shaped hood moulds.	II
Haworth House; 53.74598°N 0.32984°W		Mid-18th century	The house, later used for other purposes, is in brick, rendered at the rear, with stone dressings, moulded wooden eaves, and a pantile roof with coped gables. There are three storeys and seven bays. In the centre is a brick doorcase, and a sandstone entablature and pediment with an inscription and date. The windows are sashes with flat brick arches and keystones.	II
Trinity House; 53.74235°N 0.33524°W		1753	The building is stuccoed, with stone dressings and slate roofs. The main block has two storeys, a front of nine bays, and a rear wing on the left of seven bays. Behind, are two internal courtyards, with the Guild House forming the north range of the main courtyard, and elsewhere are houses and offices. The main front has a plinth, quoins, a moulded cornice, and a coped parapet. The middle three bays project slightly under a pediment containing carvings and a coat of arms. In the centre is a portal with steps and two engaged Doric columns, an entablature and a segmental pediment. The doorcase has a moulded surround and a keystone and the doorway is recessed. The windows are sashes with moulded surrounds, those on the ground floor with cornices. The Guild House contains two Venetian windows.	I
23 and 24 High Street; 53.74448°N 0.32993°W		c. 1760	A pair of houses, later part of the Wilberforce House Museum, in brick on a plinth, with painted stone dressings, sill bands, a coped parapet and a pantile roof. There are three storeys and six bays. In the centre is a paired doorcase with three Roman Ionic half-columns, a pulvinated frieze, and a dentilled cornice and pediment. Flanking the doorcase are dummy windows, and on the upper floor are sash windows, all with flat brick arches and keystones.	II
Blaydes House; 53.74578°N 0.32958°W		c. 1760	A house, later an office, in brick on a rendered plinth, with stone dressings, sill bands, ground floor quoins, a cornice, a coped parapet, and pantile roofs. There are three storeys, a front range of five bays, a double depth plan, and a rear wing with two storeys and attics. In the centre is a wooden portico with marble steps, Doric columns and an entablature and a dentilled pediment, Doric pilasters, a moulded doorcase, and a double keystone. The windows are sashes with lintel, on the lower two floors with keystones. The right return has three bays, the windows in the first two bays blank. At the rear is a rendered gable, a Venetian window, and two gabled dormers.	II*
76, 77 and 78 Lowgate; 53.74502°N 0.33283°W		Mid to late 18th century	Three houses, later offices, in brick, partly rendered, on a plinth, with stone dressings, a sill band, dentilled eaves, and a slate roof with a coped gable. Nos. 76 and 77 have three storeys and eight bays. In the centre are two round-headed doorways, the left with a wrought iron grill above, and the right with panelled infill. To the left is an early 19th-century shopfront with engaged Corinthian columns and a dentilled cornice. To the right is a later shopfront with square pilasters and a moulded cornice, extending to No. 78. The upper floors contain sash windows with flat brick arches and keystones. To the right is No. 78, taller, with three storeys and three bays, in painted brick, with plain sash windows.	II
16–19 Whitefriargate; 53.74310°N 0.33624°W		Mid to late 18th century	Four houses, later shops, in painted stucco on red brick, with a moulded first floor cornice, an eaves cornice, and a blocking course. There are two storeys and eight bays. The ground floor contains 20th-century shopfronts, and a doorway with pilaster jambs, a fanlight and a keystone, and on the upper floor are casement windows with moulded surrounds.	II
20 Whitefriargate; 53.74313°N 0.33643°W		Mid to late 18th century	A house, later a shop, in stuccoed brick, with a moulded eaves cornice and a slate roof. There are three storeys and three bays. On the ground floor is a 20th-century shopfront with a recessed doorway and a fascia. The upper floors contain sash windows, the central window on the middle floor with a moulded pediment, and the outer ones with moulded cornices.	II
1 Bishop Lane; 53.74303°N 0.33110°W		Late 18th century	A house on a corner site, later used for other purposes, in brick on a plinth, with stone dressings, moulded wooden eaves, gutter and brackets, and a hipped pantile roof. There are three storeys and a basement, and fronts of three and five bays. On the front is a round-arched rendered doorway with steps leading up to a recessed door. The windows have corbelled sills, in the lower two floors they are sashes, and on the top floor they are top-hung casements. On the basement are board doors, some blocked, most with segmental heads.	II
16–20, 24 and 26 George Street; 53.74558°N 0.33815°W		Late 18th century	Houses, later shops and offices, in brick, with stucco dressings, a dentilled wooden eaves cornice, a blocking course and a slate roof. There are three storeys and nine bays. The ground floor contains 20th-century shopfronts, between which is a round-arched passage entry. The windows are sashes, those above the passage entrance with moulded surrounds, and the others with painted flat brick arches. Between the upper floors are raised panels with swags of oak leaves.	II
9½, 10, 10½ and 11 King Street; 53.74188°N 0.33594°W		Late 18th century	Four houses, later used for other purposes, in brick, partly stuccoed, with dressings in stone and brick, and roofs in tile and slate with coped gables. There are three storeys and eleven bays. The central bay has an elliptical carriage opening with imposts and multiple keystones, above which is a Venetian window and a two-light casement window. To the left is a full-length shopfront, the upper floors are stuccoed, the middle floor with sash windows. On the top floor are two-light windows, and over the left three is a parapet with a panel and a dentiled cornice. The bays to the right have two 20th-century shopfronts with tiled canopies, the left with a bow window. On the middle floor are sash windows, and the top floor contains two-light casement windows.	II
2 Land of Green Ginger; 53.74359°N 0.33445°W		Late 18th century	A house, later used for other purposes, on a triangular corner site, in brick on a rendered plinth, with stone dressings, moulded eaves, and a gabled slate roof. There are three storeys, two bays on the front, and three on the sides. On the front is an 18th-century shopfront, the door on the left with a fanlight, and the windows with Gothic glazing. Above is a fascia, a cornice on console brackets, and a low pediment. On the right return is a round-headed doorway with Doric three-quarter columns, a panelled soffit, a fanlight and a pediment. Elsewhere, there are sash windows, some tripartite, and some with lintels and keystones.	II
1 Manor Street; 53.74360°N 0.33426°W		Late 18th century	A house, later used for other purposes, in brick, with stone dressings, a wooden gutter and brackets, and a hipped pantile roof. There are two storeys and three bays. On the right bay is a doorway with a moulded surround, a divided fanlight and a cornice. The windows are sashes under flat brick arches.	II
15 Parliament Street and 52 and 53 Whitefriargate; 53.74322°N 0.33577°W		Late 18th century	Houses on a corner site, later used for other purposes, they are stuccoed and have hipped and gabled roofs. The front has seven bays, the left five bays with two storeys and the others with three storeys. The left four bays contain a 20th-century shopfront which extends round the corner. The right three bays have a rusticated plinth. The right bay contains a stuccoed doorway with square Corinthian columns, an entablature, a fanlight and a pediment. To its left are two windows with moulded surrounds, the right with a round head and a keystone, and the left with an eared architrave. Above are sash windows in architraves and a dentilled cornice. The left five bays contain sash windows, the three on the right with pediments. The left return has shopfronts, and above are pilasters and plain windows.	II
2 Percy Street; 53.74696°N 0.34178°W		Late 18th century	A house, later used for other purposes, in yellow brick on a plinth, with stone dressings, sill and floor bands, a moulded eaves cornice, and a slate roof. There are three storeys and five bays. In the centre is a doorway with Doric columns, an elliptical fanlight and a pediment, and on the extreme left and right are smaller doorways. The windows are sashes, the window above the doorway with a shouldered surround.	II
3 Percy Street; 53.74706°N 0.34178°W		Late 18th century	A house, later used for other purposes, in red brick, with stone dressings, a floor band, a sill band, moulded eaves, and a tile roof. There are three storeys and attics, and two bays. The round-headed doorway on the left has a moulded surround, a fanlight and a keystone. The windows are sashes with multi-keystone lintels, and above is a box dormer.	II
3 and 6–12 Prince Street; 53.74200°N 0.33644°W		Late 18th century	A row of eight houses with a curved plan, in stuccoed brick on a plinth, with a wooden gutter and brackets, and pantile roofs with coped gables. There are three storeys and 14 bays. The doorways have pilasters, a divided fanlight and a cornice on scroll brackets. The windows are sashes, most with flat ached heads, and some with segmental brick arches. No. 18 has a shallow oriel window with a cornice on the middle floor.	II
19 Story Street; 53.74605°N 0.34210°W		Late 18th century	A house, later a shop, in brick, with stone dressings, chamfered quoins, sill bands, modillion wooden eaves, and a slate roof. There are three storeys and attics, and two bays. On the left is a doorway with Doric columns, a round-arched opening with a fanlight, and a dentilled pediment. To the right is a 19th-century shopfront, with pilasters, and an entablature with curved brackets. The upper floors contain sash windows, those on the middle floor with splayed lintels, and above are two box dormers.	II
21, 22 and 23 Whitefriargate; 53.74318°N 0.33667°W		Late 18th century	Three houses, later shops and offices, in brick, rendered on the front, with a moulded eaves cornice, and a rendered and coped left gable. There are three storeys and nine bays. On the ground floor are three 20th-century shopfronts, and between the left two is a doorway with a semicircular fanlight and an inscribed round arch with a keystone. The upper floors contain sash windows with moulded surrounds. Three windows on the middle floor have pediments, the others have cornices, and all have scroll brackets. The top floor windows have corbelled sills.	II
30–33 Whitefriargate; 53.74329°N 0.33754°W		Late 18th century	Four houses, later shops, on a corner site, they are in stuccoed brick, with stone dressings and a hipped slate roof. There are three storeys and attics, twelve bays on Whitefriargate, three on Princes Dock Street, and a curved bay on the corner. On Whitefriargate are three shopfronts with the fourth around the corner, and on the extreme left is a doorway with Corinthian pilasters, an entablature, a cornice on decorative brackets and a heraldic crest. The upper floors contain pilasters, and windows, mainly sashes with moulded surrounds, those on the middle floor with triangular pediments or cornices, and those on the top floor with bracketed sills.	II
21–25 Worship Street; 53.74749°N 0.33638°W		Late 18th century	A block of houses incorporating a public house on the left and a church on the right. It is in brick with stone dressings, dentilled wooden eaves and a pantile roof. There are three storeys and eight bays, the middle four bays projecting under a pediment. On the left two bays, and extending round the corner, is a public house front with pilasters, a panelled stallboard and a dentilled fascia cornice. The right bay contains a Doric doorcase with a dentilled pediment and a doorway with a fanlight. Elsewhere, there are sash windows with lintels and keystones.	II
Bond Warehouse 8 and Hull Business Centre; 53.74518°N 0.33340°W		Late 18th century	Two adjacent warehouses, later offices, in brick with stone dressings, each with a painted band. The windows, which are casements, and the doorways, one of which has a fanlight, have segmental heads. The left warehouse is higher and has five storeys and five bays, the right warehouse is wider and has four storeys and six bays. The left warehouse has one bay with loft doors, and the right warehouse has two bays with loft doors, each with a square box-shaped oriel window at the top.	II
Former Richard Bakers Stables; 53.74735°N 0.34003°W		Late 18th century	A stable block and a cart shed, later used as workshops, they are in brick. The stable block on the right has a hipped pantile roof, two storeys and five bays, the outer bays projecting under coped gables. There are three carriage doorways, those on the outer bays under segmental arches, and two doorways with fanlights. One window has two lights, and the other windows on the upper floor have splayed lintels. The cart shed has two storeys and one bay, and a slate roof that has a gable with shaped bargeboards and a finial. It contains a pair of sliding doors flanked by windows, and on the upper floor is a round-arched window.	II
Charterhouse, wall and railings 53.74900°N 0.33273°W		1778–78	The almshouse is in brick on a plinth, with painted stone dressings, a dentilled eaves cornice and a hipped slate roof. There are two storeys, a main range of seven bays, and projecting three-bay wings. The middle three bays project under a dentilled pediment containing a coat of arms. In the centre is a semicircular Roman Doric portico with two columns, a frieze with a Latin inscription, and a lead dome. The recessed doorway is flanked by Doric columns and half-columns, and the windows are sashes with painted brick flat arches. On the roof is a wooden cupola with six Ionic columns and a lead dome. Enclosing the area on the front is a low brick wall with stone coping and cast iron spearhead railings and a gate.	I
Alfred Schofield House and railings 53.74513°N 0.33083°W		c. 1780	A house, at one time a sailors' home and later converted into flats, is in brick on a plinth, stuccoed on the front, with stone dressings, moulded wooden eaves and hipped slate roof. There are three storeys and five bays. In the centre, steps with convex iron balustrades lead to a doorway with pilasters, a semicircular fanlight, and an open pediment, and the windows are sashes. At the rear is a portico with Doric columns, an enriched frieze, and a dentilled pediment. There are flanking concave screen walls ending in square pavilions.	II
83–93 George Street and railings 53.74665°N 0.33585°W		c. 1782	Two houses, later used for other purposes, in brick, with rusticated stuccoed basements, painted stone dressings, sill and floor bands, moulded dentilled cornices, and hipped slate roofs. The left house has two storeys, the right house has three storeys, and each house a basement and five bays. Both houses have a central Corinthian portico approached by steps with iron railings, and a doorway with a semicircular fanlight, and above is a dentilled pediment. The windows on the front are sashes with painted flat brick arches. At the rear are two two-storey canted bay windows, and a Venetian window.	II
17 Albion Street, 1 Percy Street and railings 53.74684°N 0.34174°W		1790	A house, later an office, on a corner site, in stuccoed brick, on a plinth, with a floor band, a wooden gutter on brackets, and a hipped slate roof. There are three storeys and basements, with two bays on Albion Street, and four on Percy Street. The doorway on Percy Street has a stuccoed surround, with Ionic columns, a fanlight and a cornice, and above the doorway are two round-headed windows. The other windows are sashes, those on the ground floor of Albion Street with panelled aprons. The Albion Street doorway is in the basement, and the basement area is enclosed by cast iron railings.	II
18 Albion Street and railings 53.74682°N 0.34163°W		1790	A terraced house in brick, with a stucco basement, painted stone dressings, a sill band, dentilled wooden eaves and a slate roof. There are three storeys and a basement, and two bays. The doorway on the right is approached by steps with wrought iron railings, and has engaged Doric columns, a semicircular fanlight, and a dentilled pediment. The windows are sashes, with multi-keystone lintels on the lower two floors. The basement area is enclosed by wrought iron railings.	II
19 Albion Street and railings 53.74683°N 0.34154°W		1790	A terraced house in painted brick, with a stucco rusticated basement, sill bands, a floor band, dentilled wooden eaves and a slate roof with a coped gable on the left. There are three storeys and a basement, and two bays. The doorway on the right is approached by steps with wrought iron railings, and has engaged Doric columns, a semicircular fanlight, and a dentilled pediment. The windows are sashes with multi-keystone lintels. The basement area is enclosed by wrought iron railings.	II
20 Albion Street and railings 53.74686°N 0.34144°W		1790	A terraced stuccoed house, with a rusticated basement and ground floor, lintel bands, a wooden gutter on brackets, and a slate roof. There are three storeys and a basement, and two bays. The doorway on the right is approached by steps with wrought iron railings, and has engaged Doric columns, a semicircular fanlight, and a dentilled pediment. The windows are sashes with moulded surrounds. The basement area is enclosed by wrought iron railings.	II
21 Albion Street and railings 53.74688°N 0.34135°W		1790	A terraced house in painted brick, with a stucco rusticated basement and ground floor, sill bands, a dentilled cornice, and a slate roof. There are three storeys and a basement, and three bays. The doorway on the right is approached by steps with wrought iron railings, and has engaged Doric columns, a semicircular fanlight, and a dentilled pediment. The windows are sashes with multi-keystone lintels, those on the ground floor also with panelled aprons. The basement area is enclosed by wrought iron railings.	II
22 Albion Street and railings 53.74689°N 0.34123°W		1790	A terraced house in brick, with a basement in rusticated stone, painted stone dressings, a sill band, a floor band, a wooden gutter, and a slate roof with coped gables. There are three storeys, attics and a basement, and three bays. The doorway on the right is approached by steps with cast iron railings, and has engaged Doric columns, a semicircular fanlight, and a dentilled pediment. The windows are sashes, mainly with multi-keystone lintels, and above is a box dormer. The basement area is enclosed by renewed iron railings.	II
23 Albion Street and railings 53.74690°N 0.34112°W		1790	A terraced house in brick, with a basement in rusticated stone, with painted stone dressings, a lintel band, sill bands, a floor band, a wooden gutter on brackets, and a slate roof. There are three storeys, attics and a basement, and three bays. The doorway on the right is approached by steps with cast iron railings, and has engaged Doric columns, a semicircular fanlight, and a dentilled pediment. The windows are sashes with multi-keystone lintels, and above is a box dormer. The basement area is enclosed by cast iron railings.	II
24 Albion Street and railings 53.74691°N 0.34101°W		1790	A terraced house, later used for other purposes, in brick, with a rendered basement, painted stone dressings, a basement lintel band, a sill band, a floor band, a wooden gutter on brackets, and a slate roof with coped gables. There are three storeys, a basement, and three bays. The doorway on the right is approached by steps with cast iron railings, and has engaged Doric columns, a semicircular fanlight, and a dentilled pediment. The windows are sashes with multi-keystone lintels. The basement area is enclosed by cast iron railings.	II
25 Albion Street and railings 53.74691°N 0.34090°W		1790	A terraced house in brick, with a painted basement, stone dressings, a sill band, a floor band, dentilled wooden eaves, and a slate roof with a single coped gable. There are three storeys and a basement, and two bays. The doorway on the right is approached by steps with wrought iron railings, and has engaged Doric columns, a semicircular fanlight, and a dentilled pediment. The windows are sashes with multi-keystone lintels. The basement area is enclosed by wrought iron railings.	II
26 Albion Street and railings 53.74693°N 0.34081°W		1790	A terraced house in brick, with a painted basement, stone dressings, a sill band, a floor band, a wooden gutter on brackets, and a slate roof. There are three storeys and a basement, and two bays. The doorway on the right is approached by steps with wrought iron railings, and has engaged Doric columns, a semicircular fanlight, and a dentilled pediment. The windows are sashes with multi-keystone lintels. The basement area is enclosed by wrought iron railings.	II
27 Albion Street and railings 53.74695°N 0.34070°W	—	1790	A terraced house in brick, with a painted basement, stone dressings, a sill band, a floor band, a dentilled wooden eaves cornice, and a slate roof. There are three storeys and a basement, and two bays. The doorway on the right is approached by steps with wrought iron railings, and has engaged Doric columns, a semicircular fanlight, Greek key ornament, and a dentilled pediment. The windows are sashes with multi-keystone lintels. The basement area is enclosed by wrought iron railings.	II
28 Albion Street and railings 53.74696°N 0.34060°W		1790	A terraced house in brick, with a painted basement, stone dressings, a floor band, a modillion wooden eaves cornice, and a slate roof. There are three storeys and a basement, and three bays. The doorway on the right is approached by steps with wrought iron railings, and has engaged Doric columns, a semicircular fanlight, and a dentilled pediment. The windows are sashes with multi-keystone lintels. The basement area is enclosed by wrought iron railings.	II
29 Albion Street and railings 53.74697°N 0.34049°W		1790	A terraced house in brick, with a painted basement, stone dressings, a sill band, a floor band, a modillion wooden eaves cornice, and a slate roof. There are three storeys and a basement, and three bays. The doorway on the right is approached by steps with wrought iron railings, and has engaged Doric columns, a semicircular fanlight, and a dentilled pediment. The windows are sashes with multi-keystone lintels, and there is a box dormer. The basement area is enclosed by wrought iron railings.	II
30 Albion Street and railings 53.74698°N 0.34039°W		1790	A terraced house in brick, with a painted basement, stone dressings, a sill band, a floor band, a modillion wooden eaves cornice, and a slate roof with a coped gable on the right. There are three storeys and a basement, and three bays. The doorway on the right is approached by steps with cast iron railings, and has engaged Doric columns, a semicircular fanlight, and a dentilled pediment. The windows are sashes with multi-keystone lintels. The basement area is enclosed by cast iron railings.	II
41–51 Savile Street; 53.74454°N 0.33883°W		c. 1790	A row of ten houses, later shops, in colourwashed brick, with stone dressings and slate roofs. There are three storeys and 22 bays. The ground floor contains shopfronts mainly from the 20th century. On the upper floors, most of the windows are sashes with splayed lintels, there are some casement windows, and a canted oriel window with a panelled parapet and an open pediment on brackets.	II
Former Neptune Inn and houses 53.74302°N 0.33581°W		1794–97	A hotel and houses, later offices and shops, in brick, with painted stone dressings and slate roofs. The main block has four storeys and an attic, and seven bays, the outer bays projecting under a dentilled pediment as pavilions. The block has a sill band, a dentilled cornice, and a ramped parapet with moulded coping, raised in the centre and containing a panel with relief sculpting, including a coat of arms. In the centre of the ground floor is an elliptical-headed carriage entrance with a rusticated surround and a mask keystone, and a moulded cornice on brackets. The entrance is flanked by modern shopfronts. Above the entrance is a round-arched recess containing a Venetian window with engaged Doric columns and a peusdo-balustrade, the outer bays contain round-arched sash windows, and above the windows are panels with relief sculpture. The top floor contains a central tripartite window with a flat head, flanked by windows with segmental heads. Each pavilion has a round arch containing a tripartite sash window with a Diocletian window above. Above each pediment is a pair of oculi. The flanking wings have three storeys and three bays, and contain sash windows on the upper floors.	II*
2 Parliament Street; 53.74388°N 0.33534°W		c. 1797	A house, later an office, in brick, with painted stone dressings, a floor band, a slab-coped parapet, and a slate roof. There are three storeys and attics, and three bays. The doorway on the right has three-quarter Doric columns and a cornice. The windows are sashes with flat brick arches, those on the middle floor with wrought iron balconies on brackets, and there are two box dormers.	II
3 Parliament Street; 53.74382°N 0.33537°W		c. 1797	A house, later an office, in brick, the basement painted, the ground floor rusticated, with painted stone dressings, a floor band, a slab-coped parapet, and a slate mansard roof. There are three storeys, attics and a basement, and three bays. The doorway on the right has granite pilasters, a triple round-headed fanlight, a cornice on fluted scroll brackets, and a hallway with faience tiles. The windows are sashes, and there is a segmental-headed dormer. The basement openings are blocked.	II
4 Parliament Street; 53.74377°N 0.33536°W		c. 1797	A house, later an office, in brick, the ground floor later faced in stone, with a granite basement, a ground floor moulded sill band and cornice, a slab-coped parapet, and a slate mansard roof. There are three storeys, attics and a basement, and three bays. On the right is a segmental-headed doorway with a swan-neck pediment containing a cartouche. To its left is a large single-pane window, with top lights, a segmental head, a decorated lintel, and decorative panelled pilasters. Above are sash windows with flat brick arches and a box dormer. The basement has a blocked segmental-headed window.	II
5 Parliament Street; 53.74371°N 0.33536°W		c. 1797	A house, later an office, in brick, with stone dressings, sill bands, a slab-coped parapet, and a slate roof. There are three storeys and a basement, and three bays. On the right is a doorcase with three-quarter Ionic columns, a dentilled cornice and pediment, and a round-arched panelled opening with steps leading to a recessed doorway. The windows are sashes, those on the middle floor with semicircular wrought iron balconies, and there is a segmental-headed doorway on the basement.	II
6 Parliament Street; 53.74366°N 0.33538°W		c. 1797	A house, later an office, in brick on a plinth, with stone dressings, sill bands, a slab-coped parapet, and a slate roof. There are three storeys, attics and a basement, and three bays. On the right is a doorcase with three-quarter Ionic columns, a dentilled cornice and pediment, and a round-arched panelled opening with steps leading to a recessed doorway. The windows are sashes, above is a box dormer, and there are two segmental-headed doorways on the basement.	II
7 Parliament Street; 53.74361°N 0.33539°W		c. 1797	A house, later an office, in brick on a plinth, with stone dressings, sill bands, a slab-coped parapet, and a slate roof. There are three storeys, attics and a basement, and three bays. On the right is a doorcase with three-quarter Doric columns, a dentilled cornice and pediment, and a round-arched panelled opening with steps leading to a recessed doorway. The windows are sashes, above is a segment-headed dormer, and there are two boarded-up openings on the basement.	II
9 Parliament Street; 53.74350°N 0.33541°W		c. 1797	A house, later an office, in brick on a plinth, with stone dressings, sill bands, a slab-coped parapet, and a slate roof. There are three storeys and a basement, and three bays. On the right is a doorcase with three-quarter Doric columns, a dentilled cornice and pediment, and a round-arched panelled opening with steps leading to a recessed doorway. The windows are sashes, and there are two boarded-up openings on the basement.	II
10 Parliament Street; 53.74344°N 0.33544°W		c. 1797	A house, later an office, in brick on a plinth, with stone dressings, sill bands, a slab-coped parapet, and a slate roof. There are three storeys, attics and a basement, and three bays. On the right is a doorcase with three-quarter Ionic columns, a dentilled cornice and pediment, and a round-arched panelled opening with steps leading to a recessed doorway. The windows are sashes, above is a box dormer, and there are two openings on the basement.	II
11 Parliament Street; 53.74339°N 0.33545°W		c. 1797	A house, later an office, in brick, with a painted brick and rendered basement, stone dressings, sill bands, a slab-coped parapet, and a slate roof. There are three storeys, attics and a basement, and three bays. On the right is a doorcase with three-quarter Doric columns, a dentilled cornice and pediment, and a round-arched opening with steps leading to a recessed doorway. The windows are sashes, above is a box dormer, and on the basement is a doorway and a blocked opening to its left.	II
12 Parliament Street; 53.74333°N 0.33547°W		c. 1797	A house, later an office, in brick on a plinth, with a painted basement, stone dressings, sill bands, a slab-coped parapet, and a slate mansard roof. There are three storeys, attics and a basement, and three bays. On the right is a doorcase with three-quarter Ionic columns, a dentilled cornice and pediment, and a round-arched opening with steps leading to a recessed doorway with a blank fanlight. The windows are sashes, above is a segmental-headed dormer, and on the basement are two blocked openings.	II
16 Parliament Street; 53.74338°N 0.33575°W		c. 1797	A house, later used for other purposes, it is stuccoed, and has a rusticated basement, floor and sill bands, and moulded and dentilled eaves. There are three storeys and a basement, and six bays. The doorway has square Corinthian columns, an entablature, a fanlight and a pediment. The windows are sashes in moulded architraves, those on the ground floor with keystones, and the middle floor architraves are shouldered and eared. On the basement are two openings.	II
17 Parliament Street; 53.74346°N 0.33572°W		c. 1797	A house, later an office, in brick on a plinth, with a painted basement, stone dressings, sill bands, a slab-coped parapet, and a slate roof. There are three storeys, attics and a basement, and three bays. On the left is a doorcase with three-quarter Doric columns, a dentilled cornice and pediment, and a round-arched opening with steps leading to a recessed doorway with a blank fanlight. The windows are sashes, above is a segmental-headed dormer, and on the basement are three windows.	II
18 Parliament Street; 53.74351°N 0.33571°W		c. 1797	A house, later an office, in brick on a plinth, with a painted basement, stone dressings, sill bands, a slab-coped parapet, and a slate roof. There are three storeys, attics and a basement, and three bays. On the left is a doorcase with three-quarter Doric columns, a dentilled cornice and pediment, and a round-arched opening with steps leading to a recessed doorway with a fanlight. The windows are sashes, above are two shallow gabled dormers, and on the basement are two sash windows.	II
19 Parliament Street; 53.74357°N 0.33570°W		c. 1797	A house, later an office, in brick on a plinth, with a painted basement, stone dressings, sill bands, a slab-coped parapet, and a slate roof. There are three storeys, attics and a basement, and three bays. On the left is a doorcase with three-quarter Doric columns, a dentilled cornice and pediment, and a round-arched opening with steps leading to a recessed doorway with a fanlight. The windows on the lower two floors and basement are sashes, the top floor has cross-casement windows, and above is a box dormer.	II
21 Parliament Street; 53.74373°N 0.33565°W		c. 1797	A house, later an office, in brick on a plinth, with a painted basement, stone dressings, sill bands, a slab-coped parapet, and a slate mansard roof. There are three storeys, attics and a basement, and three bays. On the left is a doorcase with three-quarter Doric columns, a dentilled cornice and pediment, and a round-arched opening with steps leading to a recessed doorway with a blank fanlight. The windows are sashes, above is a square dormer, and on the basement are two doorways and moulded stucco panels.	II
22 Parliament Street; 53.74378°N 0.33564°W		c. 1797	A house, later an office, in brick on a plinth, with a painted basement, stone dressings, sill bands, a slab-coped parapet, and a slate roof. There are three storeys, attics and a basement, and three bays. On the left is a doorcase with three-quarter Ionic columns, a dentilled cornice and pediment, and a round-arched opening with steps leading to a recessed doorway with a blank fanlight. The windows are sashes, above is a gabled dormer, and on the basement is a double door.	II
23 Parliament Street; 53.74384°N 0.33563°W	—	c. 1797	A house, later an office, in brick on a plinth, with a rendered basement, stone dressings, sill bands, a slab-coped parapet, and a slate roof. There are three storeys, attics and a basement, and three bays. On the left is a doorcase with three-quarter Doric columns, a dentilled cornice and pediment, and a round-arched opening with steps leading to a recessed doorway with a fanlight. The windows are sashes, those on the middle floor with wrought iron balconies, above is a gabled dormer, and on the basement is a segmental-headed doorway.	II
Parliament House; 53.74350°N 0.33541°W	—	c. 1797	A house, later an office, in brick on a plinth, with painted stone dressings, sill bands, a slab-coped parapet, and a slate roof. There are three storeys and a basement, and three bays. On the right is a doorcase with three-quarter Doric columns, an entablature, a cornice with a tablet, and a round-arched opening with steps leading to a recessed doorway with a fanlight. Some windows are sashes, some are modern, and all have flat brick arches, and the basement has a segmental-arched opening.	II
3 Dock Office Row; 53.74687°N 0.33038°W		c. 1800	A house, later used for other purposes, in brick, painted on the left return, with stone dressings, a moulded eaves cornice, and a slate roof with a coped gable at the rear. There are three storeys and four bays. The doorway has pilasters, a semicircular fanlight, a decorated frieze, and a pediment. The windows are sashes with flat brick arched heads.	II
1 High Street; 53.74613°N 0.32966°W		c. 1800	The house is in red brick with a slate roof. There are two storeys and attics, and three bays. The doorway in the left bay has pilasters and a cornice, and the windows on the front are sashes with splayed lintels. On the left return are casement windows and a loft door.	II
11 and 11½ Grimston Street; 53.74710°N 0.33659°W		c. 1800	Two houses, later shops, in brick, with a moulded wooden gutter and brackets, and a hipped pantile roof. There are two storeys and attics, and three bays. On the ground floor are two 19th-century shopfronts with reeded pilasters, mullioned windows, and gabled curved brackets and cornices. On the right is a doorcase with a moulded surround and paterae, a panelled recess, and a doorway with a fanlight. The upper floor contains three canted bay windows.	II
4 and 5 Jarrett Street and railings 53.74724°N 0.33701°W		c. 1800	A pair of houses in a terrace, in brick, with rendered basements, painted stone dressings, a floor band, a modillion wooden eaves cornice, and a slate roof. There are three storeys and basements, and four bays. Steps with wrought iron railings lead up to doorways on the right, each with engaged Roman Doric columns, a semicircular fanlight and a dentilled pediment. The windows are sashes, most with multi-keystone lintels. The basement areas are enclosed by wrought iron railings.	II
6 Jarrett Street and railings 53.74722°N 0.33715°W		c. 1800	A house in a terrace, in brick, with a rendered basement, painted stone dressings, a basement lintel band, sill bands, a floor band, dentilled wooden eaves, and a slate roof with coped gables. There are three storeys and a basement, and three bays. Steps with wrought iron railings lead up to a doorway with engaged Doric columns, a semicircular fanlight, and a dentilled pediment. Above the doorway are two small casement windows, and the other windows are sashes with lintels and keystones. The basement area is enclosed by wrought iron railings.	II
8 Jarrett Street and railings 53.74719°N 0.33732°W		c. 1800	A house in a terrace, in brick, with a rendered basement, painted stone dressings, a basement lintel band, sill bands, and a tile roof. There are three storeys and a basement, and two bays. Steps with cast iron railings lead up to a doorway with engaged Doric columns, a semicircular fanlight, and a dentilled pediment. The windows are sash windows, most with slightly cambered multi-keystone lintels. The basement has a sash window and a doorway, and the area is enclosed by cast iron railings.	II
9 Jarrett Street and railings 53.74718°N 0.33742°W		c. 1800	A house in a terrace, in brick, with a rendered basement, painted stone dressings, a basement lintel band, sill bands, a moulded wooden gutted and braxkets, and a slate roof. There are three storeys and a basement, and two bays. Steps with cast iron railings lead up to a doorway with engaged Doric columns, a semicircular fanlight, and a dentilled pediment. The windows on the top floor arecasement, and on the lower two floors they are sashes, all with slightly cambered multi-keystone lintels. The basement has a cross-casement window and a doorway, and the area is enclosed by cast iron railings.	II
196 Wincolmlee; 53.75271°N 0.33246°W		c. 1800	The house, with an office attached to the right, is in brick on a plinth, with stone dressings and tile roofs. The house has two storeys and two bays. In the centre is a doorway with a fanlight, the windows are sashes, and all the openings have lintels, those on the ground floor splayed. The office has one storey and two bays, and contains a doorway with a fanlight and two windows, and all the openings have segmental brick arches.	II
Burlington Tavern; 53.74404°N 0.33470°W		c. 1800	The public house, on a corner site, is in painted brick, the ground floor in painted rusticated stucco, on a plinth, with a ground floor cornice, a moulded wooden gutter and a slate roof. There are three storeys, three bays on Manor Street and two on Alfred Gelder Street. There are two doorways with segmental-headed fanlights, one on the corner, and the ground floor windows have segmental heads, all these openings with imposts, keystones and hood moulds. On the upper floors are sash windows with rusticated lintels.	II
Independent Order of Oddfellows and railings 53.74721°N 0.33724°W		c. 1800	The house, later used for other purposes, is in brick, the basement rendered, with painted stone dressings, a basement lintel band, a wooden gutter and brackets, and a slate roof. There are three storeys and a basement, and two bays. The doorway on the right is approached by steps, and has engaged Doric columns, a fanlight, and a moulded pediment. To the left is a square bay window with a cornice, and the upper floor windows are sashes with slightly cambered lintels and keystones. The basement has a single-pane window, and the area is enclosed by wrought iron railings.	II
Prince's House and railings 53.74730°N 0.33673°W	—	c. 1800	A house, later used for other purposes, in brick with a rendered basement, stone dressings and a pantile roof. There are three storeys and a basement, and one bay. Steps with cast iron railings lead up to a doorway with engaged Roman Doric columns, a semicircular fanlight, and a dentilled pediment. To the left is a square bay window with a dentilled cornice. The windows are sashes, those on the upper two floors with multi-keystone lintels. The basement area is enclosed by cast iron railings.	II
Vauxhall Tavern Public House; 53.73814°N 0.35067°W		Late 18th to early 19th century	The public house is in yellow brick, the ground floor faced in granite, on a plinth, with painted stone dressings, moulded modillion wooden eaves, and a hipped slate roof. There are three storeys and fronts of four bays. On the ground floor are doorways with fanlights and windows with top lights, divided by pilasters, under a fascia cornice. On the front, two bays contain shallow two-storey bow windows on the upper floors. Elsewhere, there are sash windows, some blank, with lintels and keystones.	II
Humber Dock, swing bridge and lock 53.73978°N 0.33782°W		1809	The dock, later a marina, is in stone with rounded coping, and consists of a rectangular basin with rounded corners, about 250 metres (820 ft) by 100 metres (330 ft). The lock at the southern end is about 50 metres (160 ft) in length and 10 metres (33 ft) in width. At the ends are steel gates and concrete abutments. The swing bridge is dated 1864, it is in cast iron, and is a cantilever bridge with two spans, forming a central arch when closed.	II
8–13 Baker Street; 53.74731°N 0.34249°W		c. 1810	Four houses, later offices, in yellow brick on a plinth, with a string course, sill bands, moulded wooden eaves, and a hipped tile roof. There are three storeys and eleven bays. The doorways have elliptical heads, moulded surrounds, fanlights and cornices, and in the centre of the block is a round-arched entry. The windows are sashes with rusticated lintels.	II
Former Dock Offices; 53.74633°N 0.32991°W		c. 1810	The office block, which was extended later in the century, is in red brick on a plinth, with stone dressings, sill bands, a floor band, an eaves cornice, a blocking course, and a hipped slate roof. There are two storeys, an original block of five bays, and an extension of three bays to the right. The middle three bays of the original block project under a pediment containing a clock. On the front is a shallow portico with paired Doric columns and a dentilled cornice, and a doorway with sidelights and a segmental fanlight with round panes. The windows are sashes with flat brick arches, and on the roof is an octagonal cupola with a lead dome, a finial and a weathervane.	II
Former Pilot Office; 53.73856°N 0.33344°W		1819	The office building on a corner site is in brick on a plinth, with painted stone dressings, a ground floor impost band, sill bands, a moulded cornice and moulded eaves. There are three storeys and attics, and fronts of three bays. The middle bay of the main front projects slightly, and contains a Roman Doric portico with two round columns and two square three-quarter columns, an entablature and a dentilled cornice. The doorway is in a panelled recess, and has a fanlight, and above are windows with moulded surrounds. The windows are sashes, on the ground floor with round-arched heads, on the middle floor with cornices on brackets, and on the top floor with lintels. The attic storey has a rounded corner with a three-light window. To the right is a recessed two-storey single-bay extension.	II
15 and 16 Bowlalley Lane; 53.74347°N 0.33381°W		c. 1820	Two houses, later offices, in brick, the ground floor of the left house rendered with a sill band above, painted stone dressings, and a coped gable on the left. There are three storeys and four bays. The left doorway is recessed and has a divided fanlight, the right doorway has a fanlight and a hood on scrolled brackets, and in the centre is a round-headed passage entry. The windows are sashes with painted flat brick arches.	II
58 and 60 George Street and railings 53.74591°N 0.33714°W		c. 1820	A house, later used for other purposes, in painted brick, with a stucco basement, a sill band, and a tile roof with a coped gable on the left. There are three storeys and a basement, and four bays. Steps with scroll-topped wrought iron balustrades lead up to a doorway with a hood on brackets and a fanlight above. To the left is a tripartite shop window with a curved central glazing bar, The windows are sashes, the basement windows with segmental heads, and those above with painted flat brick arches. The basement area is enclosed by scroll-topped wrought iron railings.	II
66 George Street; 53.74596°N 0.33697°W		c. 1820	A house, at one time used for other purposes, in rusticated stucco, with sill bands, dentilled wooden eaves, and a tile roof with coped gables. There are three storeys and a basement, and two bays. Steps with wrought iron balustrades lead up to the doorway on the right, that has pilasters, a fanlight and a dentilled cornice. The windows are sashes, those on the upper two floors with moulded surrounds.	II
74 George Street and railings 53.74599°N 0.33689°W		c. 1820	A house, later used for other purposes, in painted stucco, with a rusticated basement and a slate roof. There are three storeys and a basement, and two bays. Steps with cast iron railings lead up to a door with moulded pilasters, a fanlight, and a cornice on ornate pedimented brackets. Most of the windows are sashes with moulded surrounds, and the basement has a three-light cross-casement window. The basement area is enclosed by a cast iron openwork balustrade with a gate.	II
82 and 84 George Street and railings 53.74603°N 0.33677°W		c. 1820	A house, later a shop, in brick, with stone dressings, a sill band and a tile roof. Three are three storeys and a basement, and one bay. Steps with a cast iron balustrade on the left lead up to a doorway on the right, with pilasters, a fanlight and a dentilled pediment. On the ground and top floors are casement windows, the middle floor has a sash window, and all have flat brick arches. The basement area is enclosed by cast iron railings.	II
86 and 88 George Street; 53.74609°N 0.33657°W		c. 1820	A house, at one time a shop, in brick, with painted stone dressings, a floor band and a sill band, and a pantile roof with coped gables. There are three storeys and a basement, and two bays. The doorway on the left is approached by steps with balustrades, and has pilasters, a fanlight and a dentiled pediment. The windows are sashes with rusticated lintels and keystones.	II
90 and 92 George Street; 53.74612°N 0.33650°W		c. 1820	A house in painted rusticated stucco, with a basement string course, sill bands, a wooden gutter, and a slate roof with a coped gable. There are three storeys and a basement, and two bays. Steps with wrought iron balustrades lead up to a doorway on the left, with Tuscan columns, a semicircular fanlight and a dentilled pediment. The windows are sashes, those on the upper two floors with lintels and keystones. The basement has a shop window and a door to the right, and the basement area is enclosed by wrought iron railings.	II
94 and 96 George Street; 53.74613°N 0.33647°W		c. 1820	The house is in painted stucco, the basement and ground floor rusticated, with sill bands, a wooden gutter, and a slate roof with a coped gable. There are three storeys and a basement, and three bays. Steps with wrought iron balustrades lead up to a doorway on the left, with Tuscan columns, a semicircular fanlight and a dentilled pediment. The windows are sashes, and the basement area is enclosed by wrought iron railings and a gate.	II
12 Grimston Street and railings 53.74730°N 0.33666°W		c. 1820	The house is in brick with a stucco basement, on a plinth, with painted stone dressings, a basement lintel band, sill bands, a wooden gutter and brackets, and a hipped slate roof. There are three storeys and a basement, and three bays. The central doorcase has panelled pilasters and scroll brackets, and a round-arched recess leads to the doorway. The windows on the front are sashes, some are blank, and they have multi-keystone lintels. On the right return is a full-height bow window. The basement area on the right return is enclosed by iron railings with a gate.	II
97 Spring Bank and railings 53.74959°N 0.35228°W		c. 1820	The house is in brick, with a rusticated basement, stone dressings, a sill band, moulded wood modillion eaves, and an artificial slate roof. There are two storeys, attics and a basement, and three bays. On the left, steps with wrought iron spearhead balustrades lead to a portico with fluted columns, an entablature with a triglyph frieze and a doorway with a fanlight. The windows are sashes, and the basement area is enclosed by wrought iron spearhead railings.	II
6, 7 and 8 Wright Street and railings 53.74785°N 0.34443°W		c. 1820	A row of three houses at the end of a terrace, in brick, the left gable rendered, with painted stone dressings, basement string courses, a moulded gutter and brackets, and artificial slate roofs. There are three storeys and basements, and nine bays. Steps with cast iron balustrades lead up to doorways on the right, each with Tuscan columns, a semicircular fanlight and an entablature. The windows are sashes with slight segmental heads and splayed lintels. The basement areas are enclosed by slender cast iron railings and gates.	II
Central Dry Dock; 53.73942°N 0.33212°W		c. 1820	The dry dock, which was later extended, is in stone with repairs in concrete, and a later brick wall. It has a pointed north end, stepped sides, and iron gates at the south end.	II
Roland House and Commercial Chambers; 53.74298°N 0.33773°W		1822	Originally the Ferres Hospital almshouses, later used as offices, the building is in brick on a plinth, with painted stone dressings, a ground floor lintel band, a sill band, a moulded cornice, and a hipped slate roof. There are two storeys and five bays, the middle three bays projecting under a pediment containing a sculpted crest and a trophy. In the centre is a doorcase with pairs of Roman Doric pilasters, a cornice with mutules, a blocking course with an inscribed tablet and anthemions, and a doorway with a moulded surround. The windows are sashes, on the ground floor they are tripartite with segmental heads, and on the upper floor they have flat brick arches.	II
53 Beverley Road; 53.75091°N 0.34811°W		c. 1825	A house, later used for other purposes, in yellow brick on a rendered plinth, with dressings in painted stone and stucco, a sill band, a moulded wooden gutter, and a slate roof with a coped gable on the left. There are two storeys and four bays. On the front is a wooden Doric portico with fluted columns, flanked by semicircular bay windows. The upper floor contains segmental-headed sash windows with lintels and keystones.	II
55 Beverley Road; 53.75100°N 0.34809°W		c. 1825	A house, later used for other purposes, in yellow brick on a rendered plinth, with painted stone dressings, sill bands, and a slate roof. There are two storeys and two bays. On the right is a porch with fluted Doric columns and a cornice, and to the left is a semicircular bay window. All the windows are sashes with cambered lintels and keystones.	II
2 and 3 Jarrett Street and railings 53.74728°N 0.33685°W	—	Early 19th century	A pair of houses in a terrace, in brick, with a rendered basement, painted stone dressings, and a slate roof. There are three storeys and basements, and two bays. Steps with wrought iron railings lead to a doorway on the right of each house, with engaged Roman Doric columns, a semicircular fanlight and a dentilled pediment. To the left of the left doorway is a canted bay window with a bracketed cornice, and above it is a small casement window. The basement has two cross-casement windows, and the other windows are sashes with multi-keystone lintels. The basement areas are enclosed by wrought iron railings.	II
Dry dock on south side of Charlotte Street; 53.74701°N 0.33009°W		Early 19th century	The dry dock is about 45 metres (148 ft) in length and 15 metres (49 ft) in width. It is in stone, mainly rendered, with stone coping and concrete repairs. The dock has a rounded west end, steel gates at the river end, and on each side are two ledges with stone coping.	II
Former Friends' Meeting House; 53.74715°N 0.34182°W		Early 19th century	A house on a corner site, at one time a Friends meeting house, in painted stucco, on a plinth, with a rusticated ground floor, quoins, a ground floor cornice, moulded wooden eaves, and a hipped slate roof. There are three storeys and two bays. On the left is a coved round-arched doorway with a radial fanlight, and to its right are four casement windows. The middle floor contains two two-light casement windows with central mullions and cornices, and on the top floor are five sash windows with moulded surrounds.	II
Mooring post (northeast); 53.73822°N 0.33619°W	—	Early 19th century	This consists of an 18th-century cast iron 32-pounder cannon buried in the dockside and used as a mooring posts for ships.	II
Mooring post (southeast); 53.73870°N 0.33653°W		Early 19th century	This consists of an 18th-century cast iron 32-pounder cannon buried in the dockside and used as a mooring posts for ships.	II
Prince's Dock Chambers; 53.74264°N 0.33778°W		Early 19th century	Five houses, later used for various purposes, in brick, with stone dressings, a wooden gutter and brackets, and slate roofs. There are three storeys and eleven bays. The middle three buildings have a channelled rusticated ground floor, and contain doorways with fanlights and sash windows. The left building has a stone-clad shopfront with panelled pilasters and two doorways with fanlights. The right building has a 19th-century shopfront with reeded pilasters and decorative capitals, and a central doorway The upper floors contain sash windows and top-hung casement windows, all with lintels and keystones.	II
24–28 Whitefriargate; 53.74322°N 0.33706°W		1826–28	A row of five shops with accommodation above, in brick, with painted stone dressings, moulded second and third floor cornices, a parapet, and a hipped slate roof. There are four storeys, the top an attic storey, and five bays. The ground floor contains five 20th-century shopfronts. On the extreme left is a doorway with granite pilasters and stone Ionic capitals, carrying acanthus brackets and a wooden cornice. Above the door is a lettered panel, and a fanlight with a coat of arms. The upper floors are divided by full-height pilasters. Most of the windows on the first floor are tripartite casements under segmental arches. On the fourth bay and on the second floor are sash windows with moulded surrounds. The attic storey has sash windows with plain surrounds.	II
Prince's Dock; 53.74265°N 0.33838°W		1827	The dock is in stone, with rounded copings and cast iron bollards. There is a rectangular plan with slightly curving sides, measuring about 200 metres (660 ft) by 120 metres (390 ft), and with blocked entrance channels at the northeast and southeast corners. Much of the dock is covered by a shopping centre carried on piles.	II
42 and 43 High Street; 53.74280°N 0.33097°W		1828	Two warehouses, later converted for other uses, in brick, on a painted plinth, with stone dressings. There are four storeys and a basement, and six bays. On each floor is a loading door converted into a window, and to the right is a round-arched carriage entrance with gates and grills above. Most of the windows are sashes with segmental heads, some blocked and some with grills.	II
Carmelite House; 53.74244°N 0.33638°W		1828	Originally almshouses, later offices, they are in painted stucco, on a plinth, with an entablature and a coped parapet. There are two storeys and 13 bays, the outer bays flanked by giant Doric columns in antis with metope and triglyph friezes. In the centre, steps with low balustrades lead to a doorway with a stucco surround, flanked by sash windows, all the openings with cornices on scroll brackets. On the upper floor are sash windows, the middle one with a moulded surround, and above the door is an inscribed block.	II
Minerva Hotel; 53.73802°N 0.33496°W		1828–29	The public house, on a triangular corner site, is in brick, partly painted, on a plinth, with stone and concrete dressings, a floor band, a wooden gutter and brackets, and a slate roof. There are three storeys, four bays on the front, five bays on the rear, and a rounded bay on the corner. On the front are two doorways with splayed concrete doorcases and inscribed lintels. Between them are casement windows, and the other windows on the front are sashes with splayed lintels. On the rear are various windows, one with a rounded head, and the others are casements and sashes.	II
37A and 37B High Street; 53.74330°N 0.33077°W		1829	Two warehouses in red brick with stone dressings, slate roofs, and four storeys. The front facing High Street has five bays, a rendered plinth, and a parapet with stone coping. In the centre, the lower three floors have loading bays, and the right bay contains an elliptical-arched carriage entrance with voussoirs. Elsewhere, there are windows with segmental brick heads. Near the top is a dated oval tie beam.	II
St Charles Borromeo's Church, presbytery, walls and railings 53.74691°N 0.33896°W		1829	The church, which was altered in 1835 and in 1894, is in brick, stuccoed on the front, with artificial stone dressings, quoins, and slate roofs. The front has five bays, with a dentilled pediment containing a coat of arms over the middle three bays. In the centre is a projecting porch with Corinthian columns and a pediment, under which is a frieze with an inscription. Flanking it are round-arched niches containing statues of saints above segmental-arched windows. Over these are three windows with eared architraves, and the outer bays contain smaller round-headed doorways with rusticated surrounds. The interior of the church is ornately decorated, with baroque and rococo features. To the right is the presbytery, with three storeys and four bays. The windows are sashes with architraves of different designs on each floor. The forecourt is enclosed by rendered and coped boundary walls with iron lattice railings and piers.	I
1, 2 and 3 Whitefriargate and 2 Trinity House Lane; 53.74285°N 0.33458°W		1829–30	Four houses, later shops on a corner site, in brick on a granite plinth, with stone dressings, a ground floor cornice, moulded eaves and a blocking course. There are three storeys, fronts of seven and three bays, and a rounded bay on the corner. On the ground floor are 20th-century shopfronts, and above are sash windows with flat brick arches, those on the middle floor with cornices on consoles, and those on the top floor with moulded surrounds.	II
4–6 Whitefriargate; 53.74289°N 0.33498°W		1829–30	A bank and flanking houses, later three shops, in brick, with painted stone dressings and a cornice. There are three storeys and eleven bays, with a pediment over the middle five bays, and a balustraded parapet above the others. The pediment contains a sculpture by Thomas Earle. On the ground floor are 20th-century shopfronts, the left with red granite and gabbro-clad piers and a recessed entrance. On the upper floors, the central five bays are flanked by Doric and Ionic pilasters. The windows are sashes with moulded surrounds, those on the middle floor with triangular pediments on scroll brackets. The outer bays contain sashes with plain surrounds, on the middle floor with cornices on consoles, and on the top floor with flat brick arches.	II
7, 8 and 9 Whitefriargate; 53.74295°N 0.33534°W		1829–30	Three houses, later shops, in brick, with painted stone dressings, a moulded eaves band, and a blocking course. There are three storeys and ten bays. On the ground floor are three 20th-century shopfronts, and to the right is a passage entry. The upper floors contain sash windows, most of which have flat brick arches. On the middle floor three windows have cornices on consoles, and the three above have moulded surrounds.	II
38A High Street; 53.74322°N 0.33083°W	—	c. 1830	The warehouse is in red brick with stone dressings, corrugated sheet roofs, and four storeys. The front facing High Street has five bays, a painted rendered plinth, and wooden gutter brackets. In the centre, the lower three floors have loading bays, and elsewhere, there are casement windows with segmental brick heads. At the rear is a gabled front and four storeys, and it contains windows and taking-in doors.	II
3, 4 and 5 Kingston Square and railings 53.74757°N 0.33879°W		c. 1830	A row of three houses, later used for other purposes, in brick, with rusticated stucco basements, painted stone dressings, sill bands, dentilled wooden eaves and slate roofs. There are two storeys, basements and attics, and nine bays. Steps with cast iron railings lead up to the doorways on the right, each with panelled pilasters, a recessed door with a fanlight, and a cornice. The windows are sashes with rusticated lintels and keystones, and above are box and gabled dormers. The basement areas are enclosed by cast iron spearhead railed balustrades and gates.	II
53 and 55 Spring Bank and railings 53.74908°N 0.34992°W		c. 1830	A pair of houses in brick, the basement rusticated, with moulded wood modillion eaves, and a slate roof. There are three storeys and basements, and four bays. On the left bay of each house, steps with wrought iron spearhead balustrades lead up to a doorway with a moulded surround, a fanlight and a cornice on consoles. The windows are sashes with lintels and keystones. The basement area is enclosed by wrought iron spearhead railings.	II
Pacific Court; 53.74295°N 0.33036°W	—	c. 1830	A group of warehouses and offices converted for other uses, in brick with stone dressings. They include two warehouses, each with four storeys and five bays. There is a warehouse and office with three storeys and three bays dating from about 1870 in Gothic Revival style, and an office dated 1899 in Renaissance Revival style, with two storeys and attics, and fronts of four and seven bays.	II
Warehouse, southeast corner of Prince's Dock; 53.74123°N 0.33823°W		c. 1830	The warehouse, later used for other purposes, is in brick on a plinth, with stone sills and hipped slate roofs. There are three storeys, a double depth plan, and fronts of five and seven bays. The entrance has an elliptical-arched head, and above and also on the other fronts, are elliptical-headed loft doors that have been converted into windows. Most of the other windows are casements with slightly segmental heads.	II
New Theatre; 53.74752°N 0.33758°W		1830–33	Originally built as assembly rooms, it was converted into a theatre in 1939. The theatre is stuccoed, on a plinth, with a floor band, a moulded cornice and entablature, and a coped parapet. There are two storeys, a front of five bays, and eleven bays on the sides, the bays divided by giant pilasters. In the centre of the front is a portico with four giant Ionic columns on pedestals, between which are transoms with glazing above. Behind are three double doors with segmental glazing, over which are windows, Elsewhere, on the front and sides are bank windows. On the right front is a feature with four giant engaged Ionic columns. On the four bays to the right are sash windows with lintels and keystones on the upper floor, and round windows below.	II
Former warehouses, Princes Dock Street; 53.74236°N 0.33769°W		1831	The warehouses, later extended, and subsequently converted for other uses, are in brick on a rendered plinth, with stone dressings and slate roofs. The original block has four storeys and a basement, and fronts of three and six bays. The front on Princes Dock Street is gabled, with a datestone in the gable, the middle bay is recessed and contains windows replacing loft doors. There is a similar bay on the left return, and the other windows have segmental heads. The rear extension has five bays, rusticated quoins, and a pedimented gable.	II
Façade of former Hull Co-Operative Institute; 53.74735°N 0.33866°W		1833	Originally the façade of a medical school, later preserved as the front of modern flats, it is in stone and has three bays. The middle bay projects, and has angle pilasters, an entablature, a frieze with a sculpted phial, a dentilled cornice and a moulded pediment.It contains a doorway approached by steps, in a rusticated panel, with a frieze and a cornice on scroll brackets. The outer bays contain sash windows.	II
Statue of Doctor John Alderson; 53.74350°N 0.35828°W		1833	The statue of the physician Dr John Alderson is by Richard Westmacott, and stands in the grounds of Hull Royal Infirmary. It is in white marble and depicts him standing, wearing ceremonial dress, and holding a book. The statue is on a square base with a deeply moulded base and top. On the front is an inscribed panel.	II
Wilberforce Monument; 53.74605°N 0.33290°W		1835	The monument commemorates William Wilberforce, it is in stone, and about 110 feet (34 m) in height. It consists of a massive fluted Doric column with a square capital, on which is a corniced drum surmounted by a standing figure. It stands on a cubical pedestal with a moulded plinth and a cornice. On each side is a segmental pediment flanked by acroteria with urns on the corners. On the sides of the pedestal are inscriptions and wreaths.	II
62–63 Market Place; 53.74263°N 0.33326°W		Early to mid-19th century	A pair of shops with offices above, in brick, stuccoed on the front, with stone dressings, banded rustication on the first floor, sill bands, and a pediment above the right shop. There are four storeys and four bays. On the ground floor are mid-19th-century shopfronts, each with a recessed central doorway, and to the right of each is a doorway above which is a numbered cartouche. The upper floors contain two Ionic pilasters. The windows are sashes, those on the upper two floors with moulded surrounds. The windows on the second floor over the left shop have cornices on consoles, and those over the right shop have pediments on consoles.	II
Chapel and statue, Trinity House; 53.74263°N 0.33633°W		1839–43	The chapel, designed by H. F. Lockwood, has a painted rusticated stucco east front, and a hipped slate roof. On the front are four giant Greek pilasters, an entablature and a pediment. In the centre is a large stained glass window, and the outer bays contain doors with fanlights. In front of the chapel is a sculpture depicting Oceanus reclining by Thomas Earle, that was moved to the front of the chapel in 1934. The west front has a portico with paired Greek pilasters, and above is a Diocletian window with a moulded surround and a keystone.	II
215 Anlaby Road, railings and gate piers 53.74299°N 0.35855°W		c. 1840	The house, later used for other purposes, is in brick, stuccoed on the front, on a plinth, with a moulded eaves band, and a hipped slate roof. There are two storeys and three bays, the middle bay slightly recessed. In the centre of the front is a Doric portico with an entablature and a pediment. To the right is a porch, and the windows are sashes with moulded surrounds. The garden front has a doorway with voussoirs, above which is a round-arched stair window and a box dormer. To the left is a three-storey bay window and to the right is a two-storey bow window with a hipped roof; all these windows have lintels with voussoirs and keystones. Along the front of the house are wrought iron railings on a stone plinth, and square gate piers with plinths and pediments, and wrought iron gates.	II
Victoria House, Cooper Street; 53.75157°N 0.33446°W		c. 1840	The house, later used for other purposes, is in brick on a rendered plinth, with stucco dressings, a wooden gutter and brackets, and a pantile roof. There are two storeys and an attic, and one bay. On the south front is a doorway with pilasters, a blind cobweb fanlight, and a dentilled cornice on decorative brackets. To the right are sash windows, the ground floor window with a cornice on moulded scroll brackets, the window on the upper floor with a splayed lintel. The north front has steps leading to an upper floor doorway with decorative pilasters, a frieze on scroll brackets with an inscribed nameplate, and a dentilled pediment, and to the left is a sash window with splayed lintel. Extending to the north is a brick wall with ramped coping.	II
Gatehouse, Trinity House; 53.74285°N 0.33769°W		1842	The gatehouse is in painted stone on a plinth, with an entablature and a stepped blocking course. There are two storeys, three bays, and four square Doric pilasters. In the centre is a moulded round-arched carriage entrance with a dated keystone. Above it is a coat of arms, and the arch is flanked by giant Ionic columns in antis. The outer bays contain sash windows, and under the arch are wrought iron gates.	II
Conservancy Buildings; 53.74262°N 0.33538°W		1843	Originally the Post Office, and extended in 1847, the office building is in painted brick, with dressings in orange brick and stone, and slate roofs. There are two ranges, each with six bays. The east range has two storeys, an entablature and a parapet. On the right is a round-arched doorway with a concave surround, a fanlight, stepped voussoirs and a keystone, and the windows have flat gauged brick lintels. The west range has one storey. The middle two bays are recessed under a triangular pediment., and the side wings have entablatures, dentilled cornices and parapets. In the centre is a two-light round-headed window, above which is a royal coat of arms in relief. Elsewhere, there are round-headed sash windows with pilasters and keystones.	II
Former Albion House; 53.74679°N 0.34267°W		c. 1846	The house, later used for other purposes, is in brick with sandstone on the front, with sill bands, and a parapet with a frieze and a moulded modillion cornice. There are three storeys and a basement, and five bays. In the centre, steps lead up to a portico with paired Doric columns and a balustraded balcony, and a doorway with a moulded surround and a rectangular fanlight. The windows are sashes in architraves. The ground floor windows have balustraded balconies on scroll brackets. Above each middle floor window is a pulvinated frieze, and a cornice, and below is a frieze with balustrades. The basement windows have shallow arched lintels.	II
Colonial Chambers; 53.74313°N 0.33769°W		1846	An office building, later used for other purposes, it is in brick on a plinth, with rusticated quoins, stone dressings, a cornice and a blocking course. There are two storeys and a basement, and five bays. The central doorway has a moulded surround and a cornice, the windows are sashes with flat heads, and there are two low basement doorways with rubbed brick elliptical heads.	II
Former Railway Dock, connecting channel and swing bridge 53.74012°N 0.33932°W		1846	The Railway Dock, later a marina, is a rectangular basin measuring about 220 metres (720 ft) by 50 metres (160 ft). It has cast iron bollards, balustrades and railings. At the eastern end is a connecting channel linking with Humber Dock, crossed by a cast iron swing bridge with two spans.	II
4, 5 and 6 Silver Street; 53.74282°N 0.33358°W		1848	An office building with later shops, designed by Cuthbert Brodrick, it is in brick, with a painted middle floor, stone dressings, and a modillion cornice. There are three storeys and nine bays. On the ground floor are three late-20th-century shopfronts under a fascia and a cornice. The upper floor contains round-headed cross-casement windows, and on the middle floor is an escutcheon and an inscription.	II
County Buildings; 53.74342°N 0.33440°W		1850	The office building is in red brick on a plinth, with stone dressings, floor and sill bands, and a modillion main cornice. There are two storeys and a basement, and four bays. On the outer bays are doorways, the windows are cross-casements, and all the openings are round-arched, with moulded surrounds, imposts, and scroll keystones with swags. The right doorway has a divided fanlight, and the left doorway leads to a recessed door with a plain fanlight. The basement has two segmental-headed openings.	II
Pillar box 53.74306°N 0.33094°W		c. 1850	The pillar box in front of No. 40 High Street is in cast iron. It consists of a circular pillar on a deep moulded base. On the front is a curved door with a panel and a monogram, and above is a slit for letters. The top is domed and slightly projecting.	II
Warehouse, Robinson Row; 53.74170°N 0.33639°W		c. 1850	The warehouse on a corner site, later used for other purposes, is in brick on a plinth, with painted stone dressings, sill bands, inscribed stucco moulded panels, a moulded wooden gutter, eaves on stucco scroll brackets, and a slate roof. There are four storeys, and fronts of five and eleven bays. The main entrance is round-arched, with rusticated pilasters and voussoirs, and a door with a semicircular fanlight, and on the left return is a doorway with a cornice on brackets. The windows are sashes, those on the ground floor on the front with pilasters and triangular pediments on scroll brackets, and on the left return with cornices on brackets. The first floor windows have moulded round heads, linked impost bands and keystones, and those on the second floor have eared and shouldered surrounds. To the left is a wall with two segmental-headed openings and keystones.	II
Empress Public House; 53.74372°N 0.33730°W		Mid-19th century	A warehouse, converted into a public house in 1903 by J. H. Hirst, it is in brick with a slate roof. There are four storeys, with one bay facing the street and five bays on the returns. Between the floors on the front are elaborate pargeted bands. On the ground floor is a round arched doorway with a fanlight, and a round arched casement window to the right. On the first and second floors is a bow oriel window, and the top floor contains a five-light mullioned window, the middle light taller with a round head. Above is a moulded pediment with pargeting in the tympanum.	II
41 Peel Street; 53.75204°N 0.35441°W		After 1850	The house is in red brick, with stucco on the rear and left gable, stucco dressings, a wooden gutter and brackets, and a slate roof. There are two storeys and three bays. In the centre is a doorcase with Corinthian pilasters, a projecting cornice on console brackets, a panelled reveal, and a doorway with a moulded surround and a fanlight. The windows on the front are sashes with splayed lintels and keystones. At the rear is a round-headed stair window and a stucco doorcase with an entablature.	II
High Flags Mill; 53.75254°N 0.33260°W		c. 1856	The disused oil mill is in brick, with stone dressings, and a slate roof with parapets and coped gables. There are three storeys, the gabled front facing the road has three bays, and there are ten bays along the sides. Most of the windows are blocked. On the left return is a covered metal bridge to an adjoining building, and a door reached by an external metal stair, with a dormer above.	II
Former Park Street Centre; 53.74634°N 0.35256°W		c. 1856	Originally a private school, it has been extended and used at times for other purposes, including as an orphanage and a college. The building is in yellow brick on a plinth, with stone dressings, sill bands, a modillion cornice, dentilled pediments, and hipped slate roofs. There are three storeys, the main block has 13 bays, and to the left is a recessed three-bay wing. The middle three bays of the main block project under a pediment containing a sculpture and a coat of arms. In the centre is a portico with Doric columns and a balustrade, and a doorway with a fanlight and side windows. Above are tripartite sash windows, the window above the portico with Composite pilasters and a segmental pediment. The flanking sash windows have triangular pediments, and those on the top floor have moulded surrounds. The windows elsewhere have slightly cambered panelled lintels with keystones.	II
Former Railway Dock warehouse 53.73969°N 0.33923°W		1857	The dock warehouse, which has been converted into flats, is in brick with stone dressings, cogged eaves and a coped parapet and gables. There are seven storeys and fronts of seven and nine bays. The loft doors have been reglazed to form French windows, and the other windows have segmental heads. The doorways are recessed.	II
Building between King's Market and the Wool Exchange; 53.74157°N 0.33506°W		c. 1860	A warehouse, later used for other purposes, in stone on the ground floor and yellow brick above, with stone dressings, cornices, moulded wooden eaves and pilasters between the bays. There are four storeys and three bays. In the centre is a doorway with a segmental-headed fanlight, flanked by shop windows with segmental heads, a transom and an outer doorway, all with keystones. The first and second floor have central segmental-head windows with keystones, flanked by tripartite sash windows, and on the top floor are five segmental-headed sashes.	II
Former Fire Station; 53.74871°N 0.34879°W		c. 1860	The former fire station is in red brick, with dressings in blue and white brick and stone, and a hipped slate roof. There are two storeys and five bays. On the front are two elliptical carriage openings with impost blocks and keystones, those on the left carved with horses' heads and on the right with firemen's heads. Flanking these, and on the upper floor, are round-arched windows. All the openings have coloured brick heads.	II
Model dwellings 53.74226°N 0.34683°W		1862	Also known as Turner's Court, and later converted into flats, it was built to provide living accommodation for the "labouring classes". There are two storeys, and it consists of three ranges with a U-shaped plan around a courtyard. The building is in white brick with bands of red brick, dressings in stone and red brick, machicolated eaves, and hipped slate roofs. In the centre of each range is a three-storey block with seven bays and three gables, and a doorway with a polychrome pointed arched head. The windows are sashes, most under segmental brick arches.	II
6 Posterngate; 53.74223°N 0.33643°W		1864	Originally parish rooms, the building is in red brick, with dressings in yellow and blue brick and stone, the right gable rendered, with sill bands, a string course, moulded brick eaves with brackets, and a slate roof. On the front are two storeys and a basement, and five bays. The outer bays contain doorway with round polychrome heads, moulded surrounds and semicircular fanlights, and are approached by steps with low iron balustrades. The windows are sashes with round polychrome heads and linked hood moulds, and are divided by brick pilasters with leaf capitals. Between the floors is an inscribed frieze, and the basement has a segmental-headed polychrome opening.	II
Former Sculcoates Goods Station; 53.75909°N 0.33731°W		1864	The goods station, since disused, was designed by Thomas Prosser for the North Eastern Railway Company. It is in red brick with stone dressings, a decorative eaves band, and roofs of slate and corrugated asbestos. The building is in one and two storeys and has fronts of 15 and four bays. The south front has four gables with overhanging roofs and pilasters buttresses, each gable containing a large Diocletian window and three smaller Diocletian windows below. The north front is blank and has four coped gables and kneelers. Along the sides are round-arched openings, some blocked, and on the north side is a single-storey office building with a hipped roof.	II
St Marys Court; 53.74356°N 0.33213°W		1864	A vicarage designed by Giles Gilbert Scott, later used for other purposes, in red brick on a plinth, with dressings in stone and blue and yellow brick, a sill band, and a slate roof. There are three storeys and attics, and three bays. The right bay is recessed, and has a canted five-light oriel window on scroll brackets. Above are two recesses with pointed arches containing segmental-headed cross-casement windows, over which are two gabled dormers. On the ground floor is a doorway with a pointed arch with a fanlight and a hood mould. To the left is a gabled bay containing pointed recesses with cross-casement-windows and hood moulds.	II
8–12 Trinity House Lane; 53.74260°N 0.33488°W		1865	Originally the Inland Revenue Office, later used for other purposes, it is in stone on a plinth, with a sill and a floor band, a moulded and dentiled cornice, a low coped parapet, and a slate roof with a lantern. There are two storeys and seven bays, the outer bays flanked by rusticated pilasters, and the middle five bay projecting with a moulded and dentilled pediment over the central bay. This bay contains a round-arched entrance, later infilled, flanked by pairs of pilasters with scrolled brackets, and a rusticated surround with a keystone and an open pediment. Above is a three-light mullioned window with an architrave containing Greek key decoration and a central pediment. The other windows are sashes with moulded surrounds and cornices.	II
Exchange Buildings; 53.74350°N 0.33293°W		1866	The exchange building on a corner site, later converted into a courthouse, is in rusticated stone on the ground floor on a vermiculated plinth, and in yellow brick above, with stone dressings, a ground floor cornice, a sill band, modillion eaves, and a slate roof. There are three storeys and a basement, and fronts of 13 and seven bays, with a rounded bay on the corner. On the corner is a round-headed doorway with a rusticated surround, an enriched frieze and a mask keystone. Above is a three-light window with Corinthian columns and pilasters, and a central segmental pediment, and the top floor has a three-light window with segmental heads and keystones. On the roof is a statue of Britannia. The windows are sashes, on the ground and top floor with segmental heads, on the middle floor with round heads, and all with keystones.	II
Statue of Andrew Marvell; 53.74175°N 0.33543°W		1867	The statue of Andrew Marvell, poet and politician, stands to the west of St Mary's Church. It is in white marble, and depicts him standing and in 17th-century dress. This is on a square granite pedestal with a chamfered top and a moulded base, and an inscription on the front, on a square limestone base.	II
The Maltings; 53.74698°N 0.33846°W		1867	A brewery converted into offices and flats in about 1988. The building is in red brick, with some yellow brick, painted stone dressings, and slate roofs. It consists of two parallel ranges with double span cross wings forming a courtyard, the ranges connected by an overhead bridge. The main block has five storeys and six bays, and flanking wings with three storeys and four bays. These have a plinth, a lintel band, modillion cornices, coped gables, and rusticated brick quoins. On the roof is an octagonal lantern with a copper ogee roof. The windows are paired, those on the ground floor with round arches and keystones, and those above with flattened segmental arches, and apart from the top floors, with keystones.	II
Former Department of Transport Marine Office; 53.74246°N 0.33685°W		1868	A pair of office buildings joined by a glazed bridge, the second block added in 1874. They are in red brick on a plinth, with dressings in blue brick and stone, a ground floor impost band, an upper floor sill band, brick eaves corbels, and slate roofs with shouldered coped gables. Both blocks have two storeys, the left with six bays, and the right with four. Each block has a doorway with a cusped fanlight, and the left block also has a doorway with a round-headed fanlight. The windows are sashes, and all the ground floor openings have round arches and linked hood moulds. The upper floor windows have segmental heads, and some are paired with central shafts. The left block has an attic with two hipped dormers, and on the inner returns are tripartite sash windows.	II
Maritime Museum; 53.74399°N 0.33858°W		1868–71	Originally dock offices, the building was converted into a museum in 1975. It is faced in Ancaster stone, the basement is in Bramley Fall stone, and the sculpture is in Portland stone. The building is on a plinth, and has a ground floor cornice with an enriched frieze, a dentilled and modillion main cornice with a sculptured frieze and a hipped slate roof with an ornamental crest. There are two storeys and an irregular triangular plan, with a convex east front. Most of the windows are round-arched cross-casements. On each corner is a cupola with six bays divided by engaged Composite columns, and a domed roof surmounted by a lantern with an obelisk finial.	II*
Former Hull Banking Company Bank; 53.74297°N 0.33309°W		1869–70	The bank building on a corner site, later used for other purposes, is in Ancaster stone with a rusticated ground floor, cornices on each floor, a moulded modillion main cornice on pairs of scrolled brackets, and a hipped slate roof. There are three storeys and a basement, fronts of five and six bays and an angled bay on the corner. The entrance on the corner bay is flanked by grey granite columns with Corinthian capitals, and has an inscribed lintel, a semicircular fanlight, and a round-arched canopy with a scroll keystone, above which is a moulded and dentilled cornice. All the windows have round-arched heads, those on the ground floor with a scrolled hood mould, panelled spandrels, and an apron. Between those on the middle floor are Corinthian pilasters and under them are balustrades, and on the top floor they are separated by paired fluted pilasters.	II
252 Anlaby Road; 53.74363°N 0.36416°W		c. 1870	The house is in yellow brick on a plinth, with stone dressings, a floor band, machicolated eaves, and a slate roof. There are two storeys and attics, and three bays, and most of the windows are sashes. The middle bay projects under a gable with bargeboards and a finial. On the ground floor is a canted bay window with a bracketed sill, a central ringed granite column, and a hipped roof. Above is a three-light window with pilasters, and in the attic is a window with a pointed segmental head. The narrow left bay contains a porch and a doorway with granite columns, over which is a textured panel, a cusped fanlight flanked by round windows, and a decorative eaves crest. The right bay contains a triangular oriel window on a granite column.	II
2 Manor Street; 53.74365°N 0.33430°W		1870	An office, later a private house, in yellow brick on a plinth, with stone dressings, and a moulded dentilled cornice, with end pedestals and ball finials. There are two storeys and three bays. On the right is a doorway flanked by panelled pilasters with foliate capitals, a fanlight and an enriched segmental pediment, above which is a moulded round-arched window opening with an oval finial. To the left are two sash window with moulded surrounds, enriched keystones, and a cornice with oval finials. Below is a corbeled sill and cast iron window guards, over a segmental-arched cellar opening. The upper floor contains three segmental-headed sash windows with scroll keystones, and corbelled sills and cast iron guards.	II
North Bridge House; 53.74741°N 0.32998°W		1870	A warehouse converted into flats in about 1989. It is in brick with moulded machicolated eaves, and slate roofs. There are five storeys, attics and a basement, and an L-shaped plan, with a front of nine bays, and a rear wing. The outer two bays at each end project slightly as pavilions, and each has a mansard roof with a finial. In the middle bay, the loft doors have been converted into windows, and at the top is a balcony with a hipped mansard roof. Most of the windows are casements with segmental heads.	II
Statue of William de-la-Pole; 53.73832°N 0.33324°W		1870	The statue of William de-la-Pole, 14th-century merchant and philanthropist, is in Nelson Street. It is in white marble, and depicts him as a bearded figure, wearing a hooded cloak, a fur-edged tunic, hoses, a belt and dagger, and his mayoral chain of office. He stands against a truncated column holding a scroll. The statue stands on a moulded pedestal and plinth in red granite, and a limestone base. On the pedestal and plinth are inscriptions.	II
The Kingston Public House; 53.74224°N 0.33509°W		c. 1870	The public house, on a triangular corner site, is stuccoed, on a plinth, with a rusticated ground floor, dentilled cornices, the lower with modillions, and the upper with a frieze of rosettes, large end pilasters, and a slate roof. There are three storeys, fronts of five bays, and a rounded bay on the corner. The ground floor contains three doorways and windows. The upper floors have cross-casement windows with chamfered corners to the panes. On the middle floor they have flat heads and are flanked by pilasters, and on the top they have round heads, impost bands and keystones.	II
Wilmington Swing Bridge; 53.75889°N 0.33608°W		c. 1870	The swing bridge was built by the North Eastern Railway to carry its line over the River Hull, and later used as a footbridge. The span is formed by arch-topped riveted wrought iron girders on a central pivot. Above the centre is a wooden cabin on a platform. This has large windows on the west side, a projecting porch on the south side approached by steel steps, and on the north side is a canted oriel window.	II
Woollen Warehouse; 53.74159°N 0.33521°W		c. 1870	The warehouse, later converted for other uses, is in brick, with red sandstone dressings, a ground floor sill band and cornice, a panelled second floor cornice on flat brackets, moulded and dentilled eaves and a tile roof. There are four storeys and a basement, and five bays. On the left bay is a doorcase with long curved brackets and a broken segmental pediment containing a crest. The doorway has a segmental fanlight and a lintel with an inscribed swag. To the right are cross-casement windows, and on the basement are two-light casement windows behind railings. The upper floors contain casement windows with segmental heads and top lights, those on the first and second floors dived by pilasters and with recessed panels below.	II
Former Fish Street Day Schools; 53.74162°N 0.33578°W		1871	The school is in brick, with stone dressings, decoration in blue brick, and a slate roof with shouldered coped gables. There are two storeys and three bays. The right bay is gabled and has a finial and chequerwork in the apex. It contains a pair of round-arched doorways in a recessed round arch, with a shaft between them and plate tracery in the tympani. The main tympanum contains blue brick decoration and the date in a roundel. Above it is an inscribed band, two round-headed windows with impost bands, and a roundel. The ground floor of the left two bays is covered by the staircase of the adjacent building. On the upper floor, the narrow middle bay contains a small round-headed window, and on the left bay is a larger four-light round-headed window.	II
Former Immigrant Station and railway platform 53.74322°N 0.34796°W		1871	The station was built by the North Eastern Railway Company and designed by Thomas Prosser. It is in yellow brick with stone dressings and hipped slate roofs. There is a single storey and 13 bays. The building contains a main doorway and a smaller doorway on the left, and the windows are top-hung casements. At the rear is a railway platform with a hipped canopy on cast iron columns, and to the south and east are stone screen walls with segmental-arched openings.	II
Marina Recreation Centre; 53.73876°N 0.34284°W		1872	An office block on a corner site, later used for other purposes, in red brick on a stepped plinth, with dressings in stone and brick, sill bands, modillion wooden eaves, and a slate roof. There are two storeys, eight bays on Kingston Street, two on Commercial Road, and five bays on the rounded corner. On the corner bay is a round-arched doorway with granite columns, and above it is a window over which is a clock. The flanking bays have sash windows, with flat heads on the ground floor and round heads above, all with pilasters. Along Kingston Street are recessed panels with dentilled heads flanked by pilasters, each containing a tall round-arched window.	II
Sculcoates Bridge; 53.75427°N 0.32894°W		1874	The bridge carries Chapman Street over the River Hull. It is a swing bridge with riveted wrought iron girders, the arch tops forming the span. On each side are wooden pathways with wrought iron rails. The pivoted end is at the west, where there are pedestals containing panels with coats of arms and inscriptions, and a pair of fluted cast iron bollards with caps.	II
Former Hull Hydraulic Power Company premises 53.75025°N 0.33394°W		1875	The former works on a corner site are in red brick on a rendered plinth, with blue brick dressings, and on the top is a cast iron water tank. There is a single storey and fronts of four and two bays. The windows have round arches of coloured brick, impost blocks and keystones, and contain casements with cast iron glazing bars.	II
King's Buildings; 53.74154°N 0.33474°W		1875	A warehouse, later used for other purposes, in yellow brick, the ground floor in stone, on a plinth, with stone dressings, a ground floor cornice, string courses, and moulded eaves. There are four storeys and seven bays. The outer bays are flanked by rusticated pilasters, and the middle bay projects slightly under a segmental pediment. The central doorway and the ground floor windows have segmental heads with shaped keystones, and are divided by pilasters. The upper floors contain sash windows, on the first and second floors with flat arched heads and cornices, and on the top floor with segmental heads and shaped keystones.	II
161 High Street; 53.74367°N 0.33086°W		Late 19th century	An office building on a corner site in brick, on a stone plinth with channelled rustication, a ground floor lintel band, sill bands, a frieze with relief panels and swags, dentilled eaves, a coped parapet, and a slate roof. There are two storeys and attics, and fronts of five and seven bays, with an angled bay on the corner. The doorway has a rectangular fanlight and a segmental pediment, and the windows are sashes. On the front are two roof dormers with pilasters and pediments, on the corner is a three-light canted dormer with a pediment containing a coat of arms, and on the right return are two smaller hipped dormers with lead ogee roofs.	II
Bridge over drain 53.75367°N 0.33662°W		Late 19th century	The bridge carries Lockwood Street over the Beverley and Barmston Drain. It consists of a wrought iron cambered beam with pierced and coped cast iron balustrades, and red brick abutments with stone piers and yellow brick flanking walls. The piers are square and panelled, on pedestals, and have plinths and corniced caps. The flanking walls are curved, with plinths, and square brick end piers with slightly pyramidal caps.	II
9 Market Place; 53.74261°N 0.33290°W		1875–77	An office building, later used for other purposes, in stone on a plinth, rusticated on the ground and first floors, with tile hanging on the right return, a first floor band, cornices between the floors, and a dentilled and modillion main cornice. There are four storeys and four bays. On the right bay is a doorway with decorated panelled pilasters, a fluted coved surround, a fanlight, a panelled lintel, and a stone canopy on giant consoles. On the left bay is a doorway, and between the doorways are two windows, all with panelled reveals and fanlights. The upper floors contain sash windows, with moulded surrounds, on the first floor with triangular pediments on brackets, and balconies with balustrades, on the second floor with cornices on brackets, and on the top floor with a lintel.	II
Imperial Chambers; 53.74333°N 0.33420°W		1876	An office building on a corner site, it is in yellow and red brick on a plinth, with a channelled basement, a ground floor cornice, sill and impost bands, and a moulded main cornice. There are three storeys and a basement, fronts of four and three bays, and a blind angled corner. The round-arched doorway has double pilasters on rusticated brick pedestals, a cornice on brackets, and a carved keystone. Above, running through the upper storeys is a two-light window with panelled pilasters, and a triangular open pediment. The windows on the middle floor have segmental heads, two lights, a central shaft, and a hood mould with a decorative finial. The top floor contains paired two-light round-arched windows with a brick mullion. The basement openings have segmental heads.	II
Cogan House; 53.74345°N 0.33354°W		1876–78	An office building in brick on a plinth, with dressings in stone and moulded brick, sill bands, a cornice, a panelled coped parapet, and a slate roof. There are three storeys and attics, and nine bays. On the front is a round arch with decorative spandrels, a cornice and a balustrade, containing two doorways, each with a moulded tympanum, above which is a cusped roundel. To the left are four sash windows, and to the right is a shop window and a doorway. On the upper floor are round-arched sash windows separated by pilasters. Above is a large dormer with a cornice and machicolations, with paired gabled dormers to the left and a single gabled dormer to the right.	II
Former Blundell Street School; 53.75074°N 0.34514°W		1878	The school, no longer in use, is in brick on a plinth, with stone dressings, sill bands, dentilled eaves and slate roofs. It is in one and two storeys, and consists of two blocks, each with three bays, and a corner tower. The tower has three stages, corner buttresses, a panelled frieze, dentilled eaves, and a pyramidal roof with a cross finial. Most of the window are lancets with transoms and hood moulds. On the roof is a traceried bell turret with a pyramidal roof.	II
Former Midland Bank; 53.74320°N 0.33551°W		1878–79	The bank building on a corner site is in Portland stone and sandstone, on a banded rusticated plinth, with a deep modillion cornice and a slate roof. There are three storeys, a basement and an attic, a west front of six bays, a south front of four bays, an angled bay on the corner, and an extension on the south of two storeys and one bay. The doorway on the corner has decorated pilasters, and a triangular pedimented hood on giant curved brackets, with a dated cartouche, The upper floors are flanked by Corinthian columns, and contain tripartite windows. At the top is a shouldered gablet with a segmental pediment and a finial, and flanked by urns. The round floor has vermiculated rusticated bands and windows with carved head keystones. The upper floor windows are sashes, on the middle floor with triangular pediments on brackets, and on the top floor with segmental pediments. The small attic windows have two lights and architraves.	II
6 Baker Street; 53.74723°N 0.34322°W		1879	An office building, extended in 1910, and later used for other purposes, it is in stone and brick on a plinth, with granite dressings, a sill band, a coped panelled parapet and a slate roof with coped shaped gables and ball finials. There are two storeys and attics, and ten bays. The two doorways have paired granite pilasters, and each has a segmental-headed fanlight and a segmental pediment. The ground floor windows are sashes with segmental heads and scrolled keystones, two flanked by rusticated pilasters. Above is a moulded cornice. The upper floor windows are flat-headed sashes, four with semicircular wrought iron balconies, and the others with shaped aprons.	II
Oriel Chambers; 53.74415°N 0.33025°W		1879	An office building in brick on a plinth, with stone dressings, a decorative floor band and frieze, a deep dentilled cornice, a pierced balustrade, intermediate and corner pilasters rising to pedestals with ball finials, and a slate roof. There are two storeys, a basement and attics, and seven bays. In the centre is a round-arched doorway with a semicircular fanlight, a keystone and a hood mould. Above it is a bow-fronted oriel window with an inscribed base, over which is a round window with a keystone, and a shaped gable with a pediment and a ball finial. Outside this are two shouldered dormers, each with an entablature and a pediment, containing a round-arched window. Most of the other windows are mullioned and transomed with top lights, and the basement has openings with lintels.	II
254–260 Anlaby Road; 53.74364°N 0.36448°W		c. 1880	Two pairs of offices in yellow brick, with stone dressings, and slate roofs with shaped gables. There are two storeys, attics and basements, and six bays. Both pairs have central porches approached by steps, and flanking canted bay windows, and most of the other windows are sashes. The left porch and flanking bay windows have columns with carved capitals, cornices and flat roofs. Above, the windows have round heads and hood moulds. The right porch has two arches on columns with elliptical heads, and the bay windows have similar heads. The windows above have segmental or pointed-arched heads and hood moulds.	II
Former Corporation Pier Station; 53.73846°N 0.33410°W		1880	A railway station built for the Manchester, Sheffield and Lincolnshire Railway Company, and later converted into offices, the building is in brick on a plinth, with stone dressings, a rendered floor band, and a slate roof. There are two storeys and eight bays. On the front are two doorways with fanlights, the left converted into a window, the windows are mullioned with two lights, and all the openings have quoined surrounds. In the centre is a coped shaped gable with a finial containing a clock, and a trefoil with company's initials.	II
Lister Court; 53.74443°N 0.32901°W		c. 1880	A warehouse converted into flats, in brick with a slate roof. There are four storeys and attics, and fronts of nine and twelve bays. The windows date from the 20 century, and have segmental heads. On the quayside front, two of the bays are gabled, they contain loft doors converted into windows, and between them is a derrick crane on brackets.	II
Former Charterhouse School; 53.74841°N 0.33199°W		1881	The school site is roughly L-shaped, and contains a single-storey infants' school and a two-storey main school. The schools are in brick with stone dressings and slate roofs, and are in Gothic Revival style. Most of the windows are casements, some are mullioned and transomed and there are lancet windows. On the roof of the infants' school is an ornate octagonal bell tower with a slate roof and an ornamented cross, and the main school has a masonry bellcote. The grounds are enclosed by a brick wall containing an arched entrance with an embossed pediment.	II
79 Lowgate; 53.74524°N 0.33288°W		1882	The building on a corner site, at one time the City Record Office, was extended by adding a storey and a turret in 1908. It is in red brick on a blue brick plinth, with stone dressings, string courses, a cornice and slate roofs. There are five storeys and a basement, with fronts of five and three bays, and a curved bay on the corner. The doorway on the corner bay has a moulded stone surround, Doric half-columns and pilasters, an entablature and a double keystone. Above is a round-headed window with a pointed-arched hood mould, and a roundel with a date and a coat of arms. Over this is a segmental-arched window, and a larger window with a keystone. On top of the bay is a round tower with one stage, a three-light window, a dentilled cornice, and a conical roof with a finial. Elsewhere, the windows on the ground and first floors are sashes, with round-arched heads and hood moulds. On the second floor are round windows, and above are casement windows, with segmental heads on the fourth floor, and keystones on the top floor. The basement windows have chamfered lintels with latticework grills.	II
Victoria Chambers; 53.74335°N 0.33377°W		1882–89	An office building in brick on a plinth, with stone dressings, lintel and sill bands, a moulded cornice, and a slate mansard roof. There are three storeys and attics, and five bays, the middle bay projecting under a shouldered coped gable with a segmental pediment. This bay is flanked by pilaster strips, and contains a splayed round-arched entrance with steps, imposts and a decorative keystone, and above it is an inscribed tablet. The left bay contains a cart entrance with a chamfered lintel, a segmental-headed fanlight and a decorated keystone. Above it is a two-storey bowed oriel window, and there is a similar window on the upper floors of the right bay. The other windows are sashes, those on the ground floor with decorative keystones.	II
Former Burns' Head public house 53.74342°N 0.33720°W		1884	The public house, later a shop, is stuccoed, and has a slate roof. There are three storeys and attics, and two bays. On the ground floor is a modern shopfront. The first floor has two windows with moulded cornices, keystones, and triangular pediments. Between them is a round-headed niche with a shell finial on scrolled brackets, and outside them are ornamented pilasters with Corinthian capitals and swags. Above them is a moulded cornice with swags. The top floor has two casement windows with swan-neck pediments and swags. On the attic are two dormers with segmental heads and keystones, flanked by elaborate volutes, and above them are shell pediments with finials.	II
Standidge Buildings; 53.74380°N 0.33168°W		1884	Warehouses and offices, later converted for other uses, in red brick, with terracotta details, stone dressings and slate roofs. The buildings are grouped round a rectangular courtyard. The front has three storeys and four bays, and a central carriage entrance with an inscribed and decorated cast iron beam. The entrance and outer bays are flanked by full height pilasters with decorative capitals. The windows have segmental-arched brick lintels, with moulded or fluted keystones, and hood moulds. Extending from the middle floor is a timber-framed pulley block, and on this floor is an initialled datestone.	II
Statue of William Wilberforce; 53.74428°N 0.33008°W		1884	The statue of William Wilberforce, politician and philanthropist, is in the garden of his home, Wilberforce House. It is in stone, and depicts a life-size standing figure by a short column, on a square granite pedestal. On the pedestal is an inscription.	II*
Former Colonial and United States Mortgage Company Office; 53.74301°N 0.33447°W		1884–86	The office building, on a corner site, is in stone, with rusticated and banded pilasters, ornamented entablatures, moulded cornices, and a slate mansard roof. There are three storeys and attics, two bays on the front, six along the right return, and a canted bay on the corner. The ground floor contains a modern shopfront with the entrance on the corner, and on the right return are three cross windows separated by vermiculated pilasters with swags. The first floor on both fronts has mullioned and transomed sash windows, with balustrades, and decorated panels above. On the top floor are mullioned windows with decorated cast iron balconies, and above are dormers with swan-neck pediments.	II
Northumberland Almshouses; 53.75778°N 0.33843°W		1884–87	A group of almshouses in brick, partly roughcast, with applied timber framing, stone dressings and tile roofs. They are mainly in two storeys and are arranged around a quadrangle. The gatehouse has a Tudor arched carriage entrance with wrought iron gates, and above it is a stone oriel window. Behind it is a square clock tower with a parapet, surmounted by a wooden arcade and a swept roof, and to the right is a canted stair tower. The ranges have eight bays, and at the angled corners are hexagonal turrets. On the north side is a chapel with a nave, a chancel, a vestry, a porch and a bellcote. The individual houses are gabled and contain casement windows.	II
Hull and East Riding Museum; 53.74350°N 0.33069°W		1885	Originally the corn exchange, it was converted into a museum in 1925. The building is in brick with a stone front, on a plinth, with lintel and sill bands, a modillion main cornice and a similar attic cornice, and a pierced coped parapet. There are two storeys, a basement and an attic, and three bays. The entrance projects through two floors, and has a round arch with a mask keystone, carved spandrels, a semicircular fanlight, and flanking Corinthian half-columns. It contains a pair of wrought iron gates with names and the date. The windows on the outer bays are tripartite casements with mullions, those on the upper floor with small balustraded balconies. The attic has round-headed windows with keystones, and above are a central panel with a coat of arms, and pedestals with ball finials.	II
7 Land of Green Ginger; 53.74333°N 0.33439°W		c. 1888	An office building in brick, with dressings in stone and moulded brick, a sill band, a moulded ground floor cornice, dentilled coved eaves and a tile roof. There are two storeys, attics and a basement, and six bays. The right bay projects slightly, and contains a doorway with pilasters on reeded pedestals, a moulded surround, a wrought iron traceried fanlight, and a segmental pediment with strapwork and a ball finial. Above is a round window with a moulded surround, and most of the other windows are cross-casements. The middle two bays on the upper floor are flanked by canted pilasters, and above is a pedimented through-eaves dormer. The basement contains segmental-headed openings, and on the roof are pedimented dormers.	II
35 High Street; 53.74363°N 0.33063°W		c. 1890	An office building in brick on a plinth, with stone dressings, sill bands, modillion wooden eaves and a slate roof. There are three storeys and five bays. On the ground floor are tripartite sash windows with moulded surrounds, and to the right is a doorway with a moulded surround and a fanlight. The middle floor contains three canted oriel windows with hipped lead roofs. Between them and on the top floor are sash windows.	II
Victoria House, Park Street; 53.74740°N 0.35249°W		1890	A children's hospital, later offices, in red brick on a plinth, with stone dressings, sill bands, a string course, corbelled eaves, and slate roofs. There are two storeys and seven bays, and a tower to the right. The middle bay projects, and is flanked by two-stage buttresses with panelled pinnacles and spires. There is a crocketed coped gable with a finial and an inscribed band, and above is a stepped tripled lancet window. On the ground floor is a doorway with a pointed arch, shafts, roundels and a hood mould, the doors have a Tudor arch and a traceried fanlight, and above is a pointed-arched recess with a triple lancet window. The second and sixth bays have canted pilasters, pinnacles and a coped gable. Most of the windows are lancets with transoms. The tower is square, with three stages, a corbel table and a pyramidal roof.	II
Paragon Arcade; 53.74383°N 0.34199°W		1891	The shopping arcade contains nine shopfronts on each side, separated by pilasters. The upper storey has polychrome banding, and contains cross-casement windows with pointed arches, a moulded sill band and a continuous hood mould. Above is a glazed roof with traceried cast iron ribs with pointed arches, and at each end is a polychrome gable with a quatrefoil window in a moulded circular surround. The entrance on Paragon Street has three storeys and four bays, and a moulded archway with shaft imposts and decorated spandrels. The outer bays contain shopfronts, on the middle floor are three canted oriel windows, and the top floor has triple round-headed lancet windows with polychrome heads. The Carr Lane entrance has three storeys and three bays, and is otherwise similar.	II
Former White House Hotel; 53.74455°N 0.34280°W		1891	The hotel on a corner site was converted into shops and offices in 1994. It is in brick on a plinth, with dressings in stone and terracotta, a dentilled main cornice and a slate roof. There are four storeys and attics, a front of four bays, and a polygonal tower on the corner. The doorway in the middle bay has a terracotta surround, it is flanked by Ionic columns, and has a segmental head and a double keystone. Over it is a Diocletian window with a keystone, and a two-storey canted oriel window. Above the cornice is a coped parapet, bands and round windows, and in the centre is a coped gable with volutes. On the ground floor are 20th-century round-headed shop windows, and above are sash windows. On the angled corner is a recessed doorway behind Ionic columns.	II
Dram Shop Public House; 53.74542°N 0.33865°W		1894	The public house, on a corner site, is in brick on a granite plinth, with stone dressings, string courses, a corbel table, a panelled coped parapet, and a slate roof. There are two storeys and attics, and fronts of four bays, with an angled bay on the corner. On the ground floor is a segmental-headed ground floor opening, with granite piers and decorated spandrels, containing a window, above which is a wheel window. Over this is a balcony with a pierced balustrade, and at the top is a wheel window under a coped gable. The openings are in recessed round arches with pointed hood moulds, the doorway have cusped fanlights, and the windows, which are casements have cusped upper lights.	II
Hepworth's Arcade; 53.74258°N 0.33399°W		1894	The shopping arcade has an L-shaped plan, with entrances in Silver Street and Market Place. It is covered by a barrel-vaulted roof in iron and glass, with a glazed octagon over the central corner. The sides are lined by shopfronts divided by pilasters with foliate capitals, and above them are cornices. On the upper floor are two-light windows with columns or pilasters. Each entrance front has three storeys and three bays, and the entrance has a moulded cast iron segmental arch with a keystone, a spoked fanlight, and a decorated soffit and spandrels. Above the entrances are two-storey oriel windows.	II
Northern Branch Library; 53.75595°N 0.34843°W		1894	The library is in brick on a plinth, with stone dressings, sill and impost bands, string courses, a parapet and slate roofs. There are three blocks. The central block has two storeys and contains a gabled porch with a shouldered arched opening, flanked by transomed windows. Above is a gabled through-eaves dormer containing a cross-casement window, above which is an inscription. The right block is gabled and contains a three-light window with a cornice on each floor. In the angle is a two-storey octagonal stair turret with lancet windows, an embattled parapet, and a spire. The left block also projects under a gable, with a traceried panel at the top, and is flanked by square buttresses with square-domed traceried turrets. It contains a mullioned cross-casement window in a moulded arched opening, flanked by small gabled buttresses with niches, and there is a coat of arms in the tympanum.	II
Alexandra Hotel; 53.73748°N 0.35360°W		c. 1895	The public house, on a corner site, is in brick on a plinth, the ground floor in faience, with terracotta and stone dressings, cornices, a panelled ornamented parapet, and a tile hipped mansard roof with gables. There are two storeys and attics, and fronts of six and five bays, and a canted bay on the corner. There are three doorways with pilasters, oval fanlights and swan-neck pediments. On the corner bay is an ornate parapet with a shaped gable flanked by octagonal columns. On the ground floor are large windows with elliptical or round heads and keystones, and the upper floor has sash windows.	II
The Polar Bear; 53.75137°N 0.35980°W		1895	The public house, on an acutely angled corner site, is in brick, with stone dressings, a first floor cornice, a sill band, a dentilled main cornice, and a slate roof. There are two storeys and attics, and fronts of eight and four bays, a rounded bay on the corner, and a single-storey four-bay extension. On the ground floor are two entrances and large windows separated by pilasters. The upper floor windows are sashes, three on the main front under a pedimented gable with keystones. Above these windows is a triangular oriel window, and there are roof dormers. The corner bay contains an upper floor window flanked by panels with carvings of anchors, and above is a carved stone pediment containing the name, festoons and scrolls.	II
Former Union Bank of York; 53.74274°N 0.33439°W		c. 1895	The bank building on a corner site, later used for other purposes, is in Ancaster stone on a granite plinth. The main block has three storeys and seven bays, and to the north is a two-storey extension with three bays and a bowed bay on the corner. The main doorway has paired Ionic columns, an entablature, a dentilled cornice and a round-arched doorway with a fanlight, a keystone and decorated spandrels. Above it is a tablet with relief sculpture, and a triangular pediment, flanked by scrolls and ball finials. The middle floor windows have flat heads and architraves, and on the top floor are round-headed windows with keystones and balustraded balconies.	II
Punch Hotel; 53.74345°N 0.33979°W		1898	The public house is in brick on a granite plinth, with terracotta dressings, a ground floor cornice, a traceried corbel table, and a tile roof. There are three storeys, and a curved front of five bays. The entrance bay contains two segmental arches with traceried lintels, above which is a parapet with the name of the building. Over this are two cross-casement windows with ogee heads, and a two-light mullioned window with a projecting surround, a traceried ogee gable and finials. The bay to the left and the two bays to the right have a canted two-storey bay window over which is an ogee-traceried balustrade. At the top is an elaborate shaped gable with linked pinnacles, and a pair of two-light mullioned windows under an ogee hood.	II
Former School Board Offices; 53.74717°N 0.34032°W		1898	The office block, later used for other purposes, is in brick on a plinth, with stone dressings, sill bands, string courses, dentilled and moulded eaves, and hipped slate roofs. It is in three and two storeys with basements, and has a front of ten bays. The middle three bays are recessed under pediments containing scrolled cartouches. The doorway has rusticated columns, a panelled frieze, and a broken scroll pediment with a scroll keystone containing a casement window. To the right is a three-light mullioned window, over which is a round arch with multiple keystones containing a cartouche. Most of the other windows are sashes with flat or segmental heads, most with keystones, and some with cornices. The basement openings have segmental heads.	II
Former Yorkshire Bank; 53.74417°N 0.33886°W		1898	The bank building on a triangular corner site, later used for other purposes, is in brick on a granite plinth, with faience on the front, terracotta dressings, string courses, a moulded main cornice, a coped parapet, and a tile mansard roof. There are three storeys and attics, and fronts of nine and five bays, with an angled bay on the corner. On the corner is a round-arched doorway with pilasters, a fanlight, and a pediment on curved brackets. Above is a three-storey octagonal oriel window, over which is a drum with a dentilled cornice, a conical tile roof with four gabled dormers, and an octagonal domed lantern with a ball finial. The ground and first floor windows have round arches, those on the first floor with keystones and decorated spandrels, divided by rusticated pilasters, and under a pulvinated frieze and a cornice. On the top floor, the windows have flat heads, each with a triangular pediment, and above are pedimented dormers and urns on pedestals.	II
Ocean Chambers		1899–1900	An office building in stone, with a ground floor entablature, sill bands, an intermediate cornice, and a tile roof. It is in three and four storeys, with basements and attics, and has three bays. Most of the windows are mullioned and transomed. The left bay has a four-storey canted bay window, and on the right bay is a three-storey bay window, both with Ionic columns and pilasters. The central doorway has diced Ionic columns, a segmental pediment on scroll brackets with a sculpture in high relief in the tympanum, a moulded surround, and a double keystone. On the top of the left bay is a shouldered coped gable, above which is a cornice, and a niche with a segmental broken pediment and a finial. On the right bay is a dormer with a coped gable, on which is a niche with a segmental pediment.	II
41 Lowgate; 53.74293°N 0.33277°W		1900	A bank on a corner site, later used for other purposes, in stone on a granite plinth, with sill bands, a ground floor cornice, a modillion main cornice, and hipped and gabled slate roofs with dormers. There are three storeys and attics, and fronts of four and three bays, and an angled bay on the corner. On the corner is an entrance with octagonal Doric columns, and a swan-neck pediment containing latticework in the tympanum. Above, are two small windows outside a relief panel flanked by pilasters with foliate capitals, a three-light mulliond window, and a gable with a window and a relief panel above. On Lowgate is a gabled bay containing mullioned windows and relief panels, and to the right are windows with pilasters and shaped brackets.	II
Castle Buildings; 53.74124°N 0.34151°W		1900	An office building on a corner site, in red brick, with stone dressings, sill and floor bands, and a slate roof. There are five bays with two storeys, and six bays curving round the corner, the last three bays with three storeys. The main doorway is arched, with a stone surround, richly carved spandrels, an enriched frieze, and a pediment, and there is a smaller simpler doorway to the right. Most of the windows are mullioned and transomed with quoined surrounds.	II
Central Public Library; 53.74670°N 0.34301°W		1900	The library is in brick and stone on a plinth, with stone dressings, string courses, a modillion eaves cornice, and a tile roof with a coped gable on the left. There are two storeys and five bays. The central bay is wider and projecting under a gable. On the ground floor is a splayed entrance with two Ionic piers in antis, and an entablature with a sculpted coat of arms in the frieze. Above is a round arch containing a mullioned window in a recess with a wrought iron balustrade. It is flanked by double Ionic pilasters with niches between, and above is a larger niche with a statue. The outer bays contain round-arched recesses on the ground floor containing sash windows, above are sash windows with projecting cornices, and all the windows have keystones. On the right is an octagonal three-stage tower, with sash windows, and the top stage has pedimented openings flanked by columns, above which is an octagonal dome.	II
Concrete workshop block, Caroline Street; 53.75111°N 0.33791°W		1900	The block is in painted reinforced concrete, an early use of the Hennebique principle. There are four storeys and fronts of eight bays. The building has a cornice, on the left is a square clock tower, and there are external steps at the rear. The windows are ccasements with segmentl or flat heads. some of whih are blank.	II
Maritime Buildings; 53.74467°N 0.33189°W		1900	An office block on a curving corner site, in brick on a granite plinth, with stone dressings, a lintel band, a floor band, a dentilled main cornice, and a coped parapet. There are four storeys, a main block of six bays, and a two-bay extension on the right. The end bays of the main block are in stone and flanked by decorative panelled pilasters with chequerwork at the top. The ground floor windows have segmental heads and keystones. Above are two-storey bay windows, the upper window with an open pediment, a keystone and an apron. The top floor has smaller bay windows with chequerwork between. On the extension, the left bay has a doorway with corniced granite pilasters, a fanlight, an inscribed tablet, and a wide segmental pediment with volutes, and to the right is a square carriage entrance.	II
Public toilets north of King William III statue 53.74121°N 0.33359°W		c. 1900	The gentlemen's public toilets in Market Place are mainly underground. They are in brick with terracotta and granite dressings, and there is a partly glazed segmental-arched lead roof. The surrounding brick wall has a moulded plinth and coping. The entrance has rectangular granite piers with arched tops containing coats of arms, and the gates are in wrought iron. Steps with glazed side walls lead down to a four-centred arch with a cartouche containing a coat of arms.	II
Salop House; 53.74396°N 0.33464°W		c. 1900	A timber framed office building, with brick infill, a ground floor cornice, stone coping, and a slate roof with a shouldered shaped coped gable. There are three storeys and three narrow bays. The ground floor has a doorway to the right with a fanlight, and a three-light mullioned window. Above is a square two-storey oriel window flanked by single windows.	II
Lifting bridge, office, railings and lamps 53.75107°N 0.33302°W		1901–02	A lifting road bridge crossing the River Hull, it consists of two riveted wrought iron spans forming a shallow segmental arch, with patterned wrought iron handrails. At each end is a pair of brick piers, some with the stumps of gas lights. On the west end is a post with a bell, and a triangular brick office with a slate roof. This contains windows and doorways with fanlights, all with segmental heads. To its left is a ramp with railings, ending with a gas lamp.	II
62–64 King Edward Street; 53.74558°N 0.34145°W		1902	Originally built as the entrance to a church, and at one time a bank, the building is in stone, with later slate cladding on the ground floor. There are two storeys and five bays. On the upper floor is a central round-headed window with a moulded surround and a double keystone. The window is flanked by rustication, and columns with cherub's heads on the capitals, carrying an open segmental pediment. The outer bays contain windows with moulded surrounds, and a double keystone incorporating a broken cornice, and are divided by pilasters. Above them is a frieze, a cornice with modillions, and a parapet with pilasters. On the roof is a cupola with square rusticated corner piers, and niches with keystones. Between the piers are Doric columns carrying a dome with a lantern and a finial.	II
Regent House; 53.74348°N 0.34432°W		1902	An office and shops on a corner site, later used for other purposes, in brick, partly rendered, with stone dressings, and a slate roof. On the corner is an entrance, above which is a polygonal tower. On the middle floor are three two-light windows separated by Ionic columns above which is a deep cornice on shaped brackets, The top floor contains three cross-casement windows with Ionic columns, over which is an octagonal roof with an ornamental weathervane. The windows are flanked by brick pillars with stone griffins. The front facing Ferensway has a canted oriel window on the middle floor, over which is a dentilled cornice. The top floor is jettied, it has a broken pediment on corbels, and contains a three-light window. The front facing Anlaby Road has a shopfront with a segmental arch, and the middle floor has an arcade of five square Tuscan columns and linking balustrades, behind which are cross-casement windows. Above are three two-light windows and a broken pediment.	II
Town Hall Chambers; 53.74433°N 0.33561°W		1902	An office building in brick on a plinth, with stone dressings, quoins, a floor band, moulded eaves, and a hipped tile roof. There are two storeys, eight bays on the front, and three on the left return. The sixth bay on the front is flanked by pilasters and has a dentilled pediment. It contains a segmental-headed doorway with a decorative keystone, festoons, and a round-arched hood. There is a similar doorway in the pedimented central bay on the left return. The windows have a segmental-headed lower pane, a mullioned upper part, and a keystone.	II
Former Western Synagogue; 53.74237°N 0.35643°W		1902	The former synagogue is in red brick on a plinth, with terracotta dressings, moulded eaves, an eaves cornice, an arched corbel table and a slate roof with a coped west gable. In the centre is a single-storey porch containing two doorways with terracotta arches on columns, and a gable. Recessed and above the porch is the main gable, and a window with five arched lights, above which is a circular opening containing a Star of David. The porch is flanked by two-storey octagonal turrets, with lancet windows and canted hipped roofs.	II
20 Parliament Street; 53.74365°N 0.33567°W		1902–04	Part of a former police station designed by J. H. Hirst, it is in brick on a rock-faced granite plinth, with stone dressings, banded rustication on the ground floor, a moulded dentilled cornice, and a coped parapet. There are two storeys and three bays. The left bay has a round-arched doorway with a rusticated surround, a fanlight and a keystone. Above is a semicircular balcony with balusters and blocks, and a segmental cross-casement window with a Gibbs surround. Over this is a recess flanked by pilasters, containing a sculpted cartouche, and a broken dentilled pediment. The other two bays contain round-headed cross-casement windows on the ground floor, and above are segmental-headed cross-casements with Gibbs surrounds, triple keystones, and flanked by engaged blocked Ionic columns.	II
Market Hall and restaurant 53.74221°N 0.33466°W		1902–04	The market hall was designed by J. H. Hirst. Its main front is in stone and red brick, with a slate roof, and a glazed roof over the central hall. The main block has two storeys and five bays divided by shallow piers. On the upper parts of the piers are bands and cartouches. The ground floor is arcaded, with a segment-headed arch in each bay with a keystone and a moulded cornice. Above these are five-light cross-mullioned windows, each with a segmental iron balcony and a panelled apron. To the right is a three-stage bell tower with a copper dome and a domed lantern. At the base is a doorway, and above is a window, both with segmental hoods. To the left of the main block is a lower block with two storeys and two bays. On the right bay is a doorway with a segmental hood, a semicircular fanlight with a moulded segmental hood, and a large keystone.	II
Queen Victoria statue and public toilets 53.74374°N 0.33921°W		1903	The statue of Queen Victoria is by H. C. Fehr. It is in bronze, and depicts the queen standing, and in imperial robes. The statue is on a rectangular pedestal in Portland stone with a cornice and rusticated coved corners. On the north and south sides are statues of female allegorical figures. The pedestal is on a double chamfered plinth with a stepped base. The statue stands on an elliptical platform, surrounded by curved steps and four walls in grey granite containing steps down to underground toilets. The walls each has a corniced balustrade with chamfered coping, and a pedestal with a cast iron latticework globe lamp.	II
The Masters Bar Public House; 53.74454°N 0.34311°W		1903	The public house, on a corner site, is in brick and terracotta, on a plinth, with terracotta dressings, a first floor cornice, sill bands, quoins on the top floor, a modillion eaves cornice, a panelled parapet with corner pedestals and finials, and a slate roof. There are four storeys and attics, and fronts of four and three bays. On the ground floor are round-arched windows with relief panels below, and decorated spandrels. The main doorway has a moulded round arch with a decorated fanlight and festoons, and at the top of the bay is a segmental pediment with a datestone. The windows on the first floor are round-headed with rusticated Ionic columns, and panelled dies with pediments. The second floor windows have round heads with triple keystones, and on the top floor they have open pediments on scroll brackets. On each front is a gabled dormer with a broken pediment and a finial.	II
City Hall; 53.74381°N 0.34008°W		1903–09	The hall, designed by J. H. Hirst, is in stone on a plinth, with a floor band, a dentilled main cornice, a coped parapet, and a copper-clad mansard roof. The entrance front has three storeys and five bays. In the centre is a Tuscan porte-cochère with a balustraded balcony, above which is a recessed portico with attached Composite columns, and a segmental pediment containing a cartouche with swags and a coat of arms. The entrance is flanked by round-arched niches containing statues, and shop windows. The middle floor contains windows, three with a keystone and a segmental arch on brackets, and on the top floor are windows interspersed by carved panels. Along the sides are ten bays divided by pilasters. On the roof is a Tuscan cupola with a copper-covered dome and a lantern. The drum has Ionic pilasters, and around it are four statues of female figures.	II*
46, 47 and 48 Whitefriargate; 53.74330°N 0.33649°W		1904	A bank, later shops, in stone, with a modillion eaves cornice, and a parapet with balustraded panels. There are three storeys and three bays. The ground floor has a shopfront with granite pilasters. On the middle floor are windows with moulded surrounds and elongated keystones, the middle window with a triangular pediment, and the outer ones with segmental pediments. The top floor has sash windows divided by paired Ionic columns and flanked by pilasters.	II
Boer War Memorial; 53.74423°N 0.34438°W		1904	The war memorial in Paragon Square has a tapering square pedestal in granite and a coved plinth. On it is a statue in marble depicting two larger than life-size soldiers with bronze rifles on a rock base. On the pedestal are bronze memorial tablets.	II
City Hotel; 53.74468°N 0.33212°W		1904	The hotel, on a corner site, is in brick on a granite plinth, with stone dressings, a ground floor cornice, sill bands, a dentilled main cornice, and a slate mansard roof, with two coped gables and a shaped gable. There are four storeys and attics, and fronts of eight bays and one bay, with a tower on the corner. The main doorway is arched, with relief carving in the tympanum, and a hood mould. To the right is a smaller round-arched doorway with granite pilasters, a semicircular fanlight, and an open pediment, and between is a small passage doorway. Most of the windows have mullions, some have transoms, and most have cornices. The corner tower is polygonal with an ogee copper dome, and above the ground floor are panels with relief carving or lettering.	II
Northern Academy of Performing Arts; 53.74341°N 0.34571°W		1904	Originally the College of Arts, it was designed by E. A. Rickards. The building is in red brick on a plinth, with stone dressings, quoins, string courses, a floor band and slate roofs. It consists of a three-storey main block, a higher three storey rear block, and flanking two-storey wings. The middle block is slightly recessed under a pedimented gable containing a mosaic by Alfred Garth Jones. Steps with railings lead up to a two-storey semicircular porch with a wrought iron railing on the top. The ground floor has a doorway with Doric columns and wrought iron lamps, and above is an oriel window flanked by caryatids. The flanking bays contain sash windows, the upper ones with an apron. The outer bays contain casement windows with moulded surrounds and cornices. On the upper floor of the returns are round windows.	II*
Trafalgar Street Church, halls and wall 53.75077°N 0.34804°W		1904	The church is in red brick, with flint panels, moulded brick dressings, and a slate roof. It consists of a nave with aisles, transepts, a gabled east end, and a southwest tower. The tower has three stages, diagonal buttresses, string courses, a corbel table with gargoyles, an embattled parapet and pinnacles with caps. On the top is a square open bell turret with a cornice and a lead spire. The adjoining halls are set transversely at the east end. At the west end is a boundary wall in brick and flint, with brick piers and wavy-topped moulded concrete coping.	II
White Hart Hotel; 53.74508°N 0.33056°W		1904	The public house is in brick and stone, partly roughcast and painted, with a tile roof. There are three storeys, a curving plan, a front of three bays, and five bays on the right return, with a two-storey two-bay wing beyond. The front has a plinth, a sill band, and a jettied gable with applied herringbone timber framing. The ground floor contains two windows with moulded round heads, top lights, decorated pilasters, and keystones. These are flanked by doorway with pilasters, semicircular fanlights, decorated spandrels, and keystones. The middle floor has a balustrade with double pilasters, a cornice, and a bow window flanked by casements. Above is an oriel window flanked by sash windows with pargetted panels below. The right return has a ground floor cornice, sill bands and coved eaves. The ground floor contains round-arched doorways and windows, and above are sashes with flat brick arches and corniced keystones.	II
46, 48 and 50 King Edward Street; 53.74533°N 0.34100°W		c. 1905	Three shops and offices on an acute angled corner site, in stone and brick, with a coped parapet and a slate roof. There are three storeys and a front of four bays. The ground floor contains late 20th-century shopfronts. On the main front, the upper floors are rusticated and have giant Ionic columns and pilasters, and sash windows. The outer bays have dentilled pediments. On the corner, the middle floor has a semicircular bay window with Ionic half-columns, and an ornate copper half-dome. On the roof is a hexagonal copper dome with curly volutes, and a circular dormer on each side. The dome is surmounted by a round lantern with volutes.	II
58 and 60 King Edward Street; 53.74551°N 0.34134°W		c. 1905	A pair of shops with offices, in stone, with coped parapets and slate roofs. There are three storeys and two bays. On the ground floor are late 20th-century shopfronts with rusticated piers, and a cornice on complex brackets. The upper floors have large segmental arches with rusticated pilasters, voussoirs, and large complex keystones, with niches rising above the parapets. The windows are sashes, on the middle floor divided by Doric columns, and the top floor with Ionic pilasters.	II
St Patrick's Church; 53.74755°N 0.34824°W		1905	The church is in red brick, with dressings in stone and brick, and slate roofs. It consists of a nave and a chancel in one, north and south aisles and side chapels, and a west organ chamber and baptistry. The chancel and south chapel have canted apsidal east ends, and the north chapel has a curved apse. At the west end is a large round-arched doorway with central and side polished marble columns, and above is a rose window with a moulded surround. To the left is a small octagonal tower with a domed bellcote and a lead roof.	II
Guildhall; 53.74444°N 0.33379°W		1906–14	The guildhall, designed by Edwin Cooper, is in stone, rusticated on the ground floor, on a granite plinth, with a modillion cornice, a balustrade and slate roofs. The south front has 33 bays, and the east entrance front has nine bays. The middle three bays of the south front project, above the doorway is a statue, and there are statues on the roof at the ends of the block. The bays of the upper floors are divided by giant Composite columns, the windows on the middle floor have keystones and alternating triangular and segmental pediments, and above are box roof dormers. The entrance front has a central portico with paired columns and a pediment. Above is a square clock tower, with an arcaded bell stage, and a lantern surmounted by four putti carrying a stone cap.	II*
Former National Westminster Bank; 53.74301°N 0.33421°W		1907	The bank building in a corner site is in Portland stone and granite on a concrete frame, with a dentilled and moulded cornice over the ground floor. At the top is a dentilled and sculpted frieze, a bracketed and moulded cornice with eight lion masks, a low parapet and a Westmorland slate roof. There are three storeys and an L-shaped plan, with a south front of seven bays, a west front of six bays, and a blind angled corner. The round-arched doorway on the south front has a semicircular metal grilled fanlight, and a decorated keystone. Above the doorway is a projecting balustraded balcony with moulded handrail, on scrolled and ornamented brackets. The ground floor has bands of pulvinated rusticated stone. All the windows are sashes, and those on the ground floor have pulvinated lintels and Celtic knot bosses. The windows on the middle floor have flat lintels and a segmental hood on ornamental brackets, and on the top floor they have moulded and shouldered surrounds. On the west front is a flat-roofed three-storey two-bay extension.	II*
Statue of Charles Henry Wilson; 53.74452°N 0.33230°W		c. 1907	The statue of Charles Henry Wilson, shipowner and politician, stands in the centre of a road junction. It is by Derwent Wood, in Portland stone, and depicts him standing, and wearing court dress. It stands on a square pedestal with a plinth, corner volutes, and a dentilled cornice, and on the convex panelled south side is a crest and an inception. The statue stands on a granite base of two steps.	II
Monument Buildings; 53.74346°N 0.33876°W		1907–08	An office building, later shops, in stone, with a ground floor cornice, a dentilled main cornice, a coped parapet with urns on pedestals, and a slate roof with a single coped gable. There are three storeys and attics, and six bays. The doorway is in granite, and has a round arch with a keystone, rusticated Ionic pilasters, a fanlight in the form of a Diocletian window, and a broken segmental pediment with a cartouche containing a datestone. It is flanked by segmental-arched windows divided by granite pilasters. The left corner is angled and contains a three-storey turret with a spire and a lead finial. The second and sixth bays contain two-storey canted bay windows with a cartouche between the floors, and above is a balustrade, and a gable with a stilted segmental pediment. Over the fourth bay is a shaped gable. The upper floor windows have two or three lights, with flat arches on the middle floor and round-arched heads on the top floor.	II
Former Head Post Office; 53.74412°N 0.33285°W		1908	The former head post office on a corner site, later used for other purposes, is in Portland stone on a granite plinth, with channelled rustication on the ground floor, a ground floor block cornice, a dentiled main cornice, and a coped parapet with balustrades, and three storeys. On Lowgate there are seven bays and projecting end bays, and the Alfred Gelder Street front has projecting end and middle bays, with five bays on each side of the middle bay. The recessed bays of the upper two floors contain giant Ionic columns, on the middle floor are sash windows with cornices, triple keystones and alternating triangular and segmental pediments, and the top flor has sash window on sill bands. The ground floor contains openings of many types, mainly round-headed windows with mask keystones.	II
1 Parliament Street; 53.74405°N 0.33534°W		c. 1910	Offices on a corner site in brick on a stone plinth, with stone dressings, polychrome pilasters, string courses, deep moulded wooden eaves, and a slate roof. There are three storeys, fronts of two and four bays, and an angled bay on the corner. All the windows have eared architraves and mullions. The two entrances on Parliament Street have deep hoods and segmental pediments, and splayed openings with steps. Above the right entrance are two bow windows. Between the entrances are two three-light cross casement windows with double keystones, to the left is a transomed window, and all have segmental heads and cornices. There are similar three-light windows on Alfred Gelder Street. The middle storey has cross casement windows, and the windows on the top floor are mullioned.	II
Street lamp (northwest); 53.74205°N 0.33515°W		Early 20th century	The electric street lamp at the northwest corner of the churchyard is in cast iron. It has a tapered fluted stem with a ladder rest and a square lamp with a finial. It stands on a rectangular pedestal with a corniced top containing switchgear, and with the maker's name inscribed.	II
Street lamp (southwest); 53.74169°N 0.33523°W		Early 20th century	The electric street lamp at the southwest corner of the churchyard is in cast iron. It has a tapered fluted stem with a ladder rest and a square lamp with a finial. It stands on a rectangular pedestal with a corniced top containing switchgear, and with the maker's name inscribed.	II
Former Lloyds Bank and offices 53.74280°N 0.33320°W		1912	The bank building on a corner site, is in stone, and the offices on Market Street have a stone ground floor and are in brick with stone dressings above, and the roofs are slated. There are three storeys and an attic. The bank has six bays on Silver Street, two bays on Market Place and an angled by on the corner, and the office has four bays. The ground floor of both is rusticated, with an architrave, a fascia, a ground floor cornice, and a modillion main cornice. The doorway has fluted Ionic columns, an architrave with a double keystone, and an open segmental pediment containing an oval shield with relief carving, and the ground floor windows have double keystones. The upper floors contain sash windows, on the middle floor with triple keystones and open triangular pediments, and on the top floor windows with double keystones. Above is a balustrade with pedestals. The windows on the upper floors of the office are sashes in architraves, those on the middle floor with cornices, and on the top floor with double keystones.	II
88 and 90 Paragon Street; 53.74418°N 0.34376°W		c. 1914	Offices and a shop in brick with a stone front, on a plinth, with a floor band, rusticated angle pilasters, a dentilled main cornice, a coped parapet with balustrade panels, and a tile mansard roof. There are three storeys and, and three bays. In the centre is a round-arched entrance with a rusticated and moulded surround, a semicircular fanlight, and a large round-arched canopy on scroll brackets. To the left is a shop window and to the right is a shopfront. The upper floors have four giant Ionic columns, and recessed between them are Venetian windows with pilasters, bracketed cornices and segmental pediments with keystones. Above are tripartite sash windows with pilasters, and on the attics are three corniced box dormers.	II
Former Lockwood Arms; 53.75161°N 0.33632°W		1914	The public house, on a corner site, is in red brick, with faience on the ground floor and on the angled corner, a floor band, wooden dentilled eaves, and hipped tile roofs. There are three storeys, four bays on Lockwood Street and three on Green Lane. On the front are three doorways and two recessed canted bay windows. Above the right doorway is a two-storey oriel window with flanking panelled pilasters, and the bays outside this are gabled. The windows are sashes with keystones. On the ground floor of the angled corner is a segmental pediment over a circular opening with a keystone and foliage decoration. The upper floor has the original name in a panel with a curved top and a keystone. The right return has two gabled bays, and similar windows divided by pilasters.	II
Former National Picture Theatre; 53.75469°N 0.34819°W		1914	The cinema was badly damaged by bombing in 1941. The remaining façade is in brick and stone, the ground floor rusticated, and the parts behind are in reinforced concrete and brick. The front has three storeys and three bays. The central entrance has a round-arched head with a keystone, and the upper floors are flanked by giant paired Ionic pilasters. The outer bays have a doorway on the ground floor, a flat-headed window with a keystone on the middle floor, and an oculus with a decorated surround on the top floor.	II
Former Tower Cinema; 53.74341°N 0.34617°W		1914	The cinema, later used for other purposes, is in brick, with white and green faience on the front, and roofs in slate and tile. The front is on a plinth, and has string courses, and a moulded dentilled cornice. The entrance is recessed, it has two storeys, and is flanked by stepped piers. At the top is a partly pierced balustrade, obelisk finials, and a central block with a seated female figure. Above the entrance is segmental arch in faience with the name in stained glass. Over it is a balcony in wrought iron with a balustrade and Ionic columns, and behind is a large lunette. On each rounded corner is a doorway with a swagged scroll pediment, above which is a cartouche with putti, and a round-arched window with a rusticated surround. At the top is a round tower with a mosaic dome and a finial.	II
K1 telephone kiosk, Market Hall; 53.74220°N 0.33467°W		c. 1921	The telephone kiosk is of the K1 type. It is in painted concrete with a moulded cornice and a tent roof. On the roof are lettered enamel signs and four iron scrolls with a spearhead finial. There is a wooden door, and windows and panels on three sides.	II
War memorial, St Mary's Church; 53.74363°N 0.33246°W		1921	The war memorial is in the churchyard, and to the south of the church. It is in stone, and in the form of a Calvary cross. The memorial has a tapered broached octagonal shaft surmounted by a crucifix and supporters under a gable. It stands on a moulded octagonal plinth, and a square base of four steps.	II
First World War Memorial and railings 53.74425°N 0.34425°W		1923	The war memorial is in Portland stone and granite, and consists of a pylon-shaped monument on a stepped base, with a moulded plinth and a plain cornice. On the front is a small credence table, and towards the top is an inscription and coat of arms in a wreath. In front of pylon is a separate tapered pedestal, and on each side is a sloping coped wall, with square enclosures at the ends, and terminating in pedestals with urns. The garden is enclosed by low bronze railings, with posts in the form of lions' heads.	II
King Albert Chambers; 53.74461°N 0.34256°W		1923	Offices and shops on a corner site, the building is in red brick, with dressings in white faience tiles, rusticated pilasters, a moulded main cornice, modillion eaves, and a tile roof. There are three storeys and attics, seven bays on the front, and three on the right return. The ground floor contains shopfronts with rusticated pilasters and brackets carrying a continuous fascia cornice. In the centre is a doorway with a moulded round arch, an inscribed lintel, and a keystone. Above is a two-storey recess containing a two-story semicircular oriel window, over which is a balustrade. The middle floor contains casement windows, on the top floor are round-headed sash windows, between the floors are moulded panels with lozenges, and above is a dormer. The middle and outer bays have elaborate stepped gables with volutes, obelisk finials and pediments.	II
Ferens Art Gallery; 53.74342°N 0.33929°W		1924–27	The art gallery has a front in Portland stone, with one storey, a projecting centre with three bays, and blind side wings. The centre bays have a plinth, an entablature with an inscribed frieze, a pierced balustrade over the middle bay, and a coped parapet over the outer bays. In the centre is a portico with two fluted Corinthian columns in antis, and flanking pilasters. The doorway has an open pediment on scroll brackets, and is flanked by windows with cornices. Above the openings is a frieze of linked circles. The outer bays have large angle pilasters and contain a round-headed window with a keystone. The wings have a frieze with swags, a moulded cornice, and a coped parapet.	II
Hebrew Gates; 53.74223°N 0.35746°W		1926	The gates at the entrance to the former Western Synagogue are in iron, and consist of central and pedestrian gates hung from the same gate piers. They are decorated with various motifs, including a Star of David, and have inscribed commemorative plates.	II
Public Conveniences, Nelson Street; 53.73819°N 0.33449°W		1926	The public conveniences are in red brick on a reconstituted stone plinth, with a frieze, a moulded cornice, a parapet, and a glazed timber framed gabled roof with a clerestory. There is a single storey, and a rectangular plan with rounded corners. On the ends are panels with mutules and blind oculi with garlands. On each side are eight oculi with rectangular panels between. At the right end of each side is a doorway, above which is a garlanded cartouche with lettering above.	II
40–44 Whitefriargate; 53.74343°N 0.33697°W		1931	A departmental store with a steel frame and a granite plinth. The south front, on Whitefriargate, is clad in cast Portland stone, and the north front, on Alfred Gelder Street, is in red brick with stone dressings. The south front has three storeys and nine bays, and on the ground floor is a shopfront. Above is a seven-bay portico in antis, with six giant fluted Doric columns and two half-columns in a moulded architrave with a panelled soffit. Between the columns are iron decorative balconies and behind them are casement windows in moulded surrounds. Above is a stepped parapet containing three motifs on a wave-form band. The north front has two storeys, and contains shop windows on the ground floor and above are tall windows and decorative brickwork.	II
K6 telephone kiosk, former Head Post Office; 53.74419°N 0.33315°W		1935	The telephone kiosk on the north side of the building is of the K6 type designed by Giles Gilbert Scott. Constructed in cast iron with a square plan and a dome, it has three unperforated crowns in the top panels.	II
Two K6 telephone kiosks, former Head Post Office; 53.74403°N 0.33271°W		1935	The telephone kiosks on the east side of the building are of the K6 type designed by Giles Gilbert Scott. Constructed in cast iron with a square plan and a dome, they have three unperforated crowns in the top panels.	II
Former Burton's department store and offices 53.74360°N 0.33753°W		1936	The building has a steel and concrete frame encased in brick, with cladding in polished emerald-pearl black granite and gold-coloured metalwork, and a parapet, raised in the centre. There are four storeys and eleven bays on the curving front. The ground floor contains shopfronts with pilasters and a moulded cornice. The middle three bays above are divided by two faience pilasters with caps, and between them are semicircular gold cast iron balconettes. Most of the windows are tall casements with white glazing bars.	II
Three Ships Mural; 53.74520°N 0.34062°W		1963	The mural was designed by Alan Boyson, and is attached to a building overlooking King Edward Square. It consists of a mosaic of glass tesserae fixed to a curved concrete screen. The mosaic is a stylised design depicting the silhouettes of three sailing boats reflected in the water below, and is in muted colours. Under the design is a Latin inscription.	II
