= St Mary's Church, Hull =

Church in Kingston upon Hull, East Riding of Yorkshire, England

- Church of St Mary, Lowgate, Kingston upon Hull
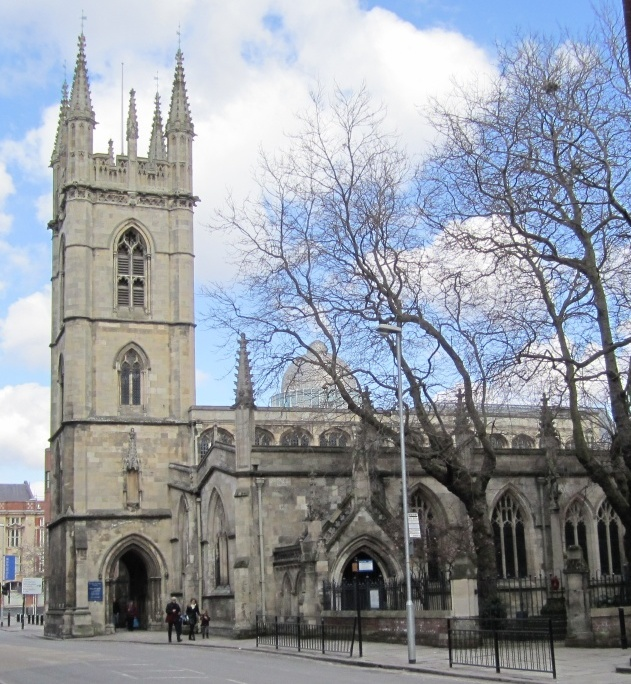
- St Mary's Church, Hull
- 53.7438°N 0.3323°W
- OS grid reference: TA 10083 28776
- Location: Lowgate, Kingston upon Hull, East Riding of Yorkshire, HU1 1EJ
- Country: England
- Denomination: Church of England
- Churchmanship: Prayer Book Catholic

History
- Status: Active
- Dedication: St Mary the Virgin

Architecture
- Functional status: Parish church
- Heritage designation: Grade II* listed

Administration
- Diocese: Diocese of York
- Archdeaconry: Archdeaconry of the East Riding
- Deanery: Kingston upon Hull
- Parish: St Mary Hull

The Church of St Mary, also known as Lowgate St Mary, is a Church of England parish church in Kingston upon Hull, East Riding of Yorkshire. The church is a grade II* listed building.

== History ==
The church dates to the 15th-century. A tower was added in 1697. The church was restored from 1861 to 1863 by Sir George Gilbert Scott, who was the cousin of the then vicar, John Scott II.

Though formerly an evangelical parish, the parish was influenced by the 19th-century Oxford Movement. The organ was built by Brindley & Foster and dates to 1904. A Temple Moore-designed rood screen was added to the chancel in 1912.

On 13 October 1952, the church was designated a grade II* listed building.

=== Present day ===
The parish of St Mary Hull is in the Archdeaconry of the East Riding of the Diocese of York.

The church continues to use the Book of Common Prayer for its services, rather than the more modern Common Worship.

== Notable people ==
- The Rt Revd Richard Wood, formerly Suffragan Bishop of Damaraland, served as Vicar from 1977 to 1979
- Richard Justice (died 1757), composer and organist at St Mary's Church, Hull
- From 1816 to 1883, St Mary's had three successive vicars, all called John Scott: John Scott (1777–1834), his son John Scott II (1809–1865), and his son John Scott III (1836–1906). The Wetherspoons pub opposite St Mary's is named The Three John Scotts after them.

== See also ==
- Grade II* listed buildings in the East Riding of Yorkshire
- Listed buildings in Kingston upon Hull (Myton Ward)

== Gallery ==
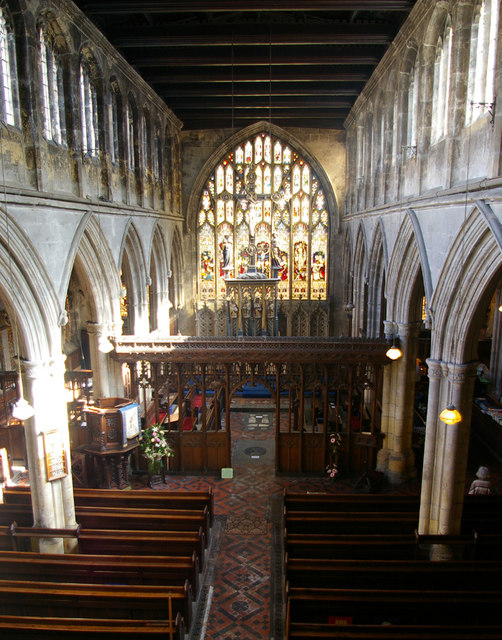
Interior of St Mary's

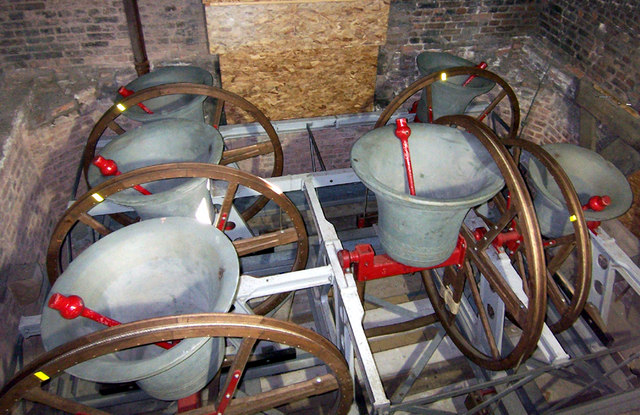
The bells
