= List of sheriffs of Kingston upon Hull =

Sheriff of Kingston upon Hull is a ceremonial title conferred by Hull City Council as a civic honour on prominent people associated with Kingston upon Hull. Hull has had a Sheriff since 1440. The position was abolished in 1974 and revived in 2013. Before 1974 the Sheriff usually served for one year; the incumbent since 2013 has been Virginia Bottomley, Baroness Bottomley of Nettlestone.

== History ==
Hull was made a county corporate in 1440, sometimes called Hullshire. All English counties had a sheriff as the head of local justice; as local government evolved the position of High Sheriff became increasingly ceremonial. The Local Government Act 1888 redesignated the county corporate of Hull a county borough which retained its civic officers. The Local Government Act 1972 abolished the county borough and officers from April 1974.

In 2012, Hull City Council issued a "loyal address" to mark Elizabeth II's diamond jubilee asking for permission to revive the offices of Sheriff and High Steward. When this was granted in 2013, the council refurbished the Sheriff's pre-1974 chain of office. The chain was funded by a bequest from Colonel Rupert Alexander Alec-Smith, who had served as Sheriff of Hull between 1949 and 1950, Lord Mayor of Hull in 1970 and 1971, and Lord Lieutenant of Humberside in 1980–83. The first appointee was former Conservative minister Virginia Bottomley, chancellor of the University of Hull.

== List ==
Hull History Centre lists the following sheriffs.

=== Henry VI ===
- 1439 John Spencer
- 1440 Richard Hanson
- 1441 Robert Awnswell
- 1442 John Garton
- 1443 William Procter
- 1444 Nicholas Ellis
- 1445 John Dares
- 1446 Thomas Farley
- 1447 John Notherby
- 1448 Richard Bill
- 1449 John Hillert
- 1450 Nicholas Stubbs
- 1451 Richard Flinton
- 1452 Thos. Patrington
- 1453 Edwd. Coppindale
- 1454 John Green
- 1455 John Swann
- 1456 Thomas Eaton
- 1457 Thos. Hawthorne
- 1458 William Eland
- 1459 Richard Hill
- 1460 Robert Sanderson

=== Edward IV ===
- 1461 Roger Bushel
- 1462 John Haddlesley
- 1463 John Day
- 1464 Robt. Rimmington
- 1465 John Whitfield
- 1466 Wm. Brompton
- 1467 William Baron
- 1468 Thomas Alcock
- 1469 John Richards
- 1470 Robert Marshall
- 1471 Robert Alcock
- 1472 Thomas Wood
- 1473 Ralph Langton
- 1474 Richard Burdon
- 1475 Robert Fisher
- 1476 Robert Scales
- 1477 Thomas Phillips
- 1478 Robert Chapman
- 1479 Richard Doughty
- 1480 Jas. Thudlington
- 1481 Robert Flinton
- 1482 John Dalton

=== Richard III ===
- 1483 Bart. Philpot
- 1484 Thomas Dalton

=== Henry VII ===
- 1485 Laurence Swatterwick
- 1486 John Wilson
- 1487 Thomas Wickliffe
- 1488 Thomas Bridges
- 1489 Robert Hoole
- 1490 Henry Mindram
- 1491 John Spicer
- 1492 Thomas Andrews
- 1493 Wm. Goodknap
- 1494 Edward Baron
- 1495 Thomas Cook
- 1496 Edward Greenby
- 1497 Thos. Gooseman
- 1498 Wm. Monckton
- 1499 Thomas Gill
- 1500 Robert Garner
- 1501 Thos. Wilkinson
- 1502 Thomas Powis
- 1503 Alex. Wharton
- 1504 Robert Bushel
- 1505 William Taylor
- 1506 John Elland
- 1507 Robert Harrison
- 1508 Wm. Williamson

=== Henry VIII ===
- 1509 Edmund Risedale
- 1510 George Mattison
- 1511 Thos Huntington
- 1512 John Langton
- 1513 Robert Hampson
- 1514 Edward Mattison
- 1515 John Harrison
- 1516 Stephen Clare
- 1517 Jeffery Thruscross
- 1518 Robert Parker
- 1519 Thos. Thompson
- 1520 Wm. Goodknap
- 1521 William Knowles
- 1522 Richard Dean
- 1523 Thomas Dalton
- 1524 William Rogers
- 1525 Richard Meekley
- 1526 William Swailes
- 1527 Richard Swale
- 1528 John Davy
- 1529 James Johnson
- 1530 Wm. Robinson
- 1531 John Harrison
- 1532 John Brown
- 1533 William Catherall
- 1534 Hugh Oversall
- 1535 Peter Mavis or Macas
- 1536 William Clark
- 1537 William Gee
- 1538 James Rogers
- 1539 Henry Dingley
- 1540 Alexander Stockdale
- 1541 John Thacker
- 1542 Richard Taylor
- 1543 John Knowles
- 1544 William Almond
- 1545 Walter Jobson
- 1546 John Oversail

=== Edward VI ===
- 1547 William Johnson
- 1548 John Thorpe
- 1549 William Angle
- 1550 Thomas Dalton
- 1551 Walter Flinton
- 1552 James Stockdale

=== Philip and Mary ===
- 1553 Hugh Hall
- 1554 William Dingley
- 1555 James Clarkson
- 1556 George Shares
- 1557 Edward Dalton

=== Elizabeth I ===
- 1558 Laurence Wharton
- 1559 Francis Thorpe
- 1560 William Gee
- 1561 John Smith
- 1562 Robert Armin
- 1563 John Bever
- 1564 William Barker
- 1565 Robert Naylor
- 1566 Thomas Dowley
- 1567 John Gregory
- 1568 William Wilson
- 1569 John Rimmington
- 1570 William Smith
- 1571 John Fairweather
- 1572 William Scearth
- 1573 John Hardcastle
- 1574 Thomas Arnelson
- 1575 John Logan
- 1576 John Clerke
- 1577 John Whelpdaile
- 1578 Edward Wakefield
- 1579 Edward Preston
- 1580 Robert Legard
- 1581 Leonard Wiston
- 1582 William Bray
- 1583 Robert Taylor
- 1584 Robert Dalton
- 1585 Wm. Richardson
- 1586 John Lyme
- 1587 Richard Read
- 1588 Anthony Colt
- 1589 Edward Cock
- 1590 John Lister
- 1591 John Chapman
- 1592 Anthony Burnsall
- 1593 James Haddlesey
- 1594 Marmaduke Haddlesey
- 1595 John Graves
- 1596 Hugh Armin
- 1597 George Almond
- 1598 William Barnard
- 1599 Robert Spencer
- 1600 Joseph Field
- 1601 Thos. Thackeray
- 1602 Christopher Chapman

=== James I ===
- 1603 James Casson
- 1604 James Watkinson
- 1605 Thomas Swann
- 1606 Richard Burgess
- 1607 Nicholas Hansley
- 1608 John Hall
- 1609 Barnard Smith
- 1610 John Preston
- 1611 Edward Richardson
- 1612 Lancelot Roper
- 1613 Robert Chapman
- 1614 Thomas Ferris
- 1615 William Dobson
- 1616 John Ramsden
- 1617 John White
- 1618 Robert Morton
- 1619 James Watkinson
- 1620 Henry Chambers
- 1621 Thomas Raikes
- 1622 Joseph Blaides
- 1623 Martin Jefferson
- 1624 John Barnard

=== Charles I ===
- 1625 Cuthbert Thompson
- 1626 William Popple
- 1627 Coniston Wrightinton
- 1628 Nicholas Denman
- 1629 Robert Raikes
- 1630 Henry Barnard
- 1631 Alexander Swann
- 1632 John Chambers
- 1633 Leonard Barnard
- 1634 William Peck
- 1635 Robert Cartwright
- 1636 Peregrine Pelham
- 1637 William Crew
- 1638 William Dobson
- 1639 Richard Parkins
- 1640 Robert Berrier
- 1641 John Rogers
- 1642 Richard Wood
- 1643 Robert Ripley
- 1644 John Ramsden
- 1645 William Maister
- 1646 Francis Dewick
- 1647 Robert Robinson
- 1648 John Kay

=== Commonwealth ===
- 1649 John Rawson
- 1650 Henry Metcalf
- 1651 William Raikes
- 1652 Richard Vevers
- 1653 Richard Robinson
- 1654 Richard Wilson
- 1655 Christopher Richardson
- 1656 William Ramsden
- 1657 George Crowle
- 1658 Edmund Popple
- 1659 John Tripp
- 1660 Robert Lambert

=== Charles II ===
- 1661 Philip Wilkinson
- 1662 Henry Cock
- 1663 Humphrey Duncalf
- 1664 William Shires
- 1665 John Pearson
- 1666 George Acklam
- 1667 Thos. Lockwood
- 1668 William Carlton
- 1669 Edward Dobson
- 1670 John Forcett
- 1671 Richard Mann
- 1672 Francis Blunt
- 1673 Arthur Saltmarsh
- 1674 Israel Popple
- 1675 Robert Mason
- 1676 Hugh Foddle
- 1677 Mark Kirby
- 1678 Francis Delacamp
- 1679 Anthony Iveson
- 1680 Matthew Johnson
- 1681 Lionel Buckle
- 1682 William Robinson
- 1683 William Catline
- 1684 Robert Nettleton

=== James II ===
- 1685 Richard Gray
- 1686 Richard Ellis
- 1687 John Blanchard
- 1688 Samuel Boyse

=== William and Mary ===
- 1689 William Idell
- 1690 William Hall
- 1691 John Collings
- 1692 Thomas Harrison
- 1693 Edmund Duncalf
- 1694 John Lindall
- 1695 Martin Raspin
- 1696 Tower Wallis
- 1697 John Chapelow
- 1698 John Thornton
- 1699 William Maister
- 1700 John Somerscales
- 1701 Andrew Perrot Anne
- 1702 Benjamin Blaydes
- 1703 Thomas Clark
- 1704 Benjamin Ward
- 1705 John Porver
- 1706 Laurence Robinson
- 1707 George Green
- 1708 John Beatniffe
- 1709 Richard Beaumont
- 1710 Joseph Green
- 1711 John Maddison
- 1712 Philip Wilkinson
- 1713 Thomas Scott

=== George I ===
- 1714 William Cogan
- 1715 John Wood
- 1716 William Winspear
- 1717 Chris. Bailes
- 1718 William Ashmole
- 1719 John Monckton
- 1720 Josiah Robinson
- 1721 Thomas Bridges
- 1722 William Mantle (who died, and was succeeded by Richard Williamson)
- 1723 George Healey
- 1724 John Wright
- 1725 Tristram Carlisle
- 1726 Thomas Ryles

=== George II ===
- 1727 Joseph Lasenby
- 1728 John Froggett
- 1729 Henry Maister
- 1730 James Milnes
- 1731 William Mowld
- 1732 Christopher Heron
- 1733 James Bee
- 1734 John Ferrand
- 1735 Henry Lee
- 1736 Andrew Perrott
- 1737 John Porter
- 1738 David Field
- 1739 James Shaw
- 1740 Richard Sykes
- 1741 William Cookson
- 1742 Hen. Etherington
- 1743 John Wood
- 1744 Charles Pool
- 1745 Francis de la Pryme
- 1746 John Fallowfield
- 1747 Walter Edge
- 1748 John Booth
- 1749 Geo. Thompson
- 1750 Christopher Scott
- 1751 Francis Beilby
- 1752 Thomas Mowld
- 1753 William Hall
- 1754 Joseph Sykes
- 1755 Joseph Thompson
- 1756 John Stephenson
- 1757 Richard Bell
- 1758 Henry Etherington, jun.
- 1759 John Porter

=== George III ===
- 1760 John Mace
- 1761 Joseph Williamson
- 1762 Marmaduke Nelson
- 1763 John Melling
- 1764 William Boulton
- 1765 Joshua Berry
- 1766 Thos. Williamson
- 1767 B.B. Thompson
- 1768 Benjamin Blaydes
- 1769 John Banks
- 1770 Stephen Bramston
- 1771 Joseph Outram
- 1772 William King
- 1773 Caius Thompson
- 1774 Henry Horner
- 1775 Samuel Standidge
- 1776 Edward Coulson
- 1777 Henry Broadley
- 1778 Edmund Bramston
- 1779 Wm. Osborne
- 1780 Joshua Haworth
- 1781 Richard Moxon
- 1782 John Bromby
- 1783 Thomas Walton
- 1784 John Voase
- 1785 James Smith (who died, and was succeeded by Wm. Hammond)
- 1786 Francis Bine
- 1787 Robt. Schonswar
- 1788 John Harneis
- 1789 John Sykes
- 1790 John Wray
- 1791 Samuel Bean
- 1792 William Watson Bolton
- 1793 Joseph Egginton
- 1794 John Bateman
- 1795 Francis Hall
- 1796 Thomas Walton
- 1797 Andrew Hollingworth
- 1798 Benj. Blaydes jun.
- 1799 William Jarratt
- 1800 E.F. Coulson
- 1801 Thos. Osbourne
- 1802 B.B. Haworth
- 1803 Nicholas Sykes
- 1804 R.W. Moxon
- 1805 Thomas Thompson
- 1806 Henry Schonswar
- 1807 Henry Thompson
- 1808 George Schonswar
- 1809 William Hall
- 1810 John Carrick
- 1811 William Moxon
- 1812 Christopher Bolton
- 1813 Avison Terry
- 1814 John Moxon
- 1815 William Bourne
- 1816 George Coulson
- 1817 William Voase
- 1818 Charles Whitaker
- 1819 T.B. Locke

=== George IV ===
- 1820 Caius Thompson
- 1821 R.M. Craven
- 1822 John Barkworth
- 1823 Francis Hall
- 1824 Edward Gibson
- 1825 Thomas Firbank
- 1826 S.T. Hassell
- 1827 Robert Raikes
- 1828 Thos. W. Gleadow
- 1829 J.K. Watson

=== William IV ===
- 1830 W.H. Barkworth
- 1831 J.B. Briggs
- 1832 Henry Broadley
- 1833 J.S. Egginton
- 1834 John Egginton
- 1835 Thos. Newmarch
- 1836 Joseph Sykes

=== Victoria ===
- 1837 Wm. Stephenson
- 1838 Joseph Jones
- 1839 William Holmes
- 1840 William Kennedy
- 1841 Samuel Westerdale
- 1842 William Empson Jalland
- 1843 John Petchell
- 1844 Robert Harrison
- 1845 Christopher Ringrose
- 1846 John Lee Smith
- 1847 John Malam
- 1848 John G. Fearne
- 1849 Anthony Bannister
- 1850 Anthony Bannister
- 1851 J.C.M. Harrison
- 1852 William Pearson Hunt
- 1853 Charles Liddell
- 1854 Joseph Gee
- 1855 John Skilbeck
- 1856 Charles S. Todd
- 1857 Martin Samuelson
- 1858 Zachariah Pearson
- 1859 William Hodge
- 1860 Edward Dannatt
- 1861 John Thomas Dobson
- 1862 Thomas Jackson
- 1863 Edwin James Davis
- 1864 John Loft
- 1865 F. Wm. Hudson
- 1866 John Bryson
- 1867 J. Bryson
- 1868 R. Jameson
- 1869 Wm. Leetham
- 1870 Charles Henry Wilson
- 1871 Henry Croft
- 1872 F. Jackson
- 1873 Charles Wells
- 1874 Francis Summers
- 1875 Albert Kaye Rollit
- 1876 William Denison
- 1877 Charles Johnson
- 1878 Robert Martin Craven
- 1879 Gerard Smith
- 1880 John Fisher
- 1881 Henry Briggs
- 1882 Evan Fraser
- 1883 Wm. Thos. Dibb.
- 1884 Kelburne King
- 1885 Henry Hunter Briggs
- 1886 John Sherburn
- 1887 Henry Allison
- 1888 Arthur Wilson
- 1889 Edward Robson
- 1890 John Symons
- 1891 John Henry Clarke
- 1892 George Beeforth Newton
- 1893 Richard Simpson
- 1894 Philip Thomas Crook
- 1895 Henry Morrill
- 1896 Walter Tom Owbridge
- 1897 Henry Whittick
- 1898 Harold James Reckitt
- 1899 Charles Henry Wellesley Wilson
- 1900 Charles Henry Wellesley Wilson

=== Edward VII ===
- 1901 Walter Herbert Cockerline
- 1902 Victor Dumoulin
- 1903 John Henry Fisher
- 1904 James Powell
- 1905 Edward Gosschalk
- 1906 John Johnson Till Ferens
- 1907 William Burwell
- 1908 George Gautby
- 1909 Thomas Shemelds Taylor

=== George V ===
- 1910 Edward Dumoulin
- 1911 John Brown
- 1912 Hubert Johnson
- 1913 Erik Olof Ohlson
- 1914 Sir Erik Olof Ohlson
- 1915 William Clarke Dawson
- 1916 Arthur Joseph Atkinson
- 1917 John Lyth Richardson
- 1918 Charles Edward Exley
- 1919 Albert Digby Willoughby
- 1920 John William Locking
- 1921 Thomas McLeod
- 1922 Herbert Dean
- 1923 Benno Pearlman
- 1924 Frank Finn
- 1925 George Henry Jefferson
- 1926 Peter Robson
- 1927 Samuel Webster
- 1928 T. Ritchie Rodger
- 1929 Frederick Till
- 1930 Robert Walter Wheeldon
- 1931 Edwin Robson
- 1932 Benno Pearlman
- 1933 Arthur Cargill
- 1934 Henry Leggott
- 1935 James Cyril Townsley

=== Edward VIII ===
- 1936 Joseph Arthur Dew

=== George VI ===
- 1937 Wallace Rockett
- 1938 Wallace Rockett
- 1939 Benno Pearlman
- 1940 Robert Greenwood Tarran
- 1941 Godfrey Robinson
- 1942 George Stanley Atkinson
- 1943 Harold Ivens Loten
- 1944 Kenneth Percival
- 1945 Herbert Wilfred Jackson
- 1946 Austen Hudson
- 1947 Henry James Barney
- 1948
- 1949 Rupert Alec-Smith
- 1950 Frank Leslie Bailey
- 1951 Lionel Rosen

=== Elizabeth II ===
- 1952 Francis Robert Metcalfe
- 1953 Bertie Svenson
- 1954 Alec Stewart Horsley
- 1955 William Henry Good
- 1956 Eric Arthur Brocklehurst
- 1957 Robert Frederick Payne
- 1958 Eric Wilson Mackman
- 1959 Helmut John Stieger
- 1960 Thomas Hugh Francis Farrell
- 1961 Basil Arthur Parkes
- 1962 William Fox
- 1963 David John Taylor
- 1964 Edward Chapman
- 1965 Thomas Burn Liddle
- 1966 Marcus Segal
- 1967 John Leslie Spooner
- 1968 Sir Leo Schultz
- 1969 John Cornelius Otten
- 1970 Basil Norman Reckitt
- 1971 Denis Robinson
- 1972 George Alfred Thomas Morris
- 1973 Arthur Richardson
- 1974–2012 position abolished
- 2013–16 Virginia Bottomley

== See also ==
- List of mayors of Kingston upon Hull
- List of stewards of Kingston upon Hull
