= John Lister =

John Lister may refer to:

- John Lister (Australian politician) (1875–1935), member Australian House of Representatives
- John Lister (gold miner), (1822–1890), 19th century New South Wales gold miner, see 1851 in Australia
- John Lister (priest) (1916–2006), Anglican Provost of Wakefield Cathedral
- John Lister (golfer) (born 1947), New Zealand professional golfer
- John Lister (academic), lecturer in journalism at Coventry University and investigative journalist specializing in health and hospitals
- John Lister (cricketer) (born 1959), cricketer
- John Lister, co-organizer of UK's Workers' Socialist League
- John Lister (philanthropist) (1847–1933), first treasurer of the British Independent Labour Party
- John Lister (died 1640) (1587–1640), English merchant and politician
- John Lister (died 1616), English lead merchant and politician
- John Lister (American football), American football coach
