= List of mayors of Kingston upon Hull =

The position of Mayor of Kingston upon Hull, Yorkshire, England was established in 1332, by Edward III with the first mayor being William de la Pole.

On 26 June 1914, it was declared that the Chief Magistrate and Officer of the City would bear the style and title of Lord Mayor due to "the city's high position in the roll of ports of [the] kingdom". The honour was confirmed for the non-metropolitan district by letters patent dated 18 March 1975.

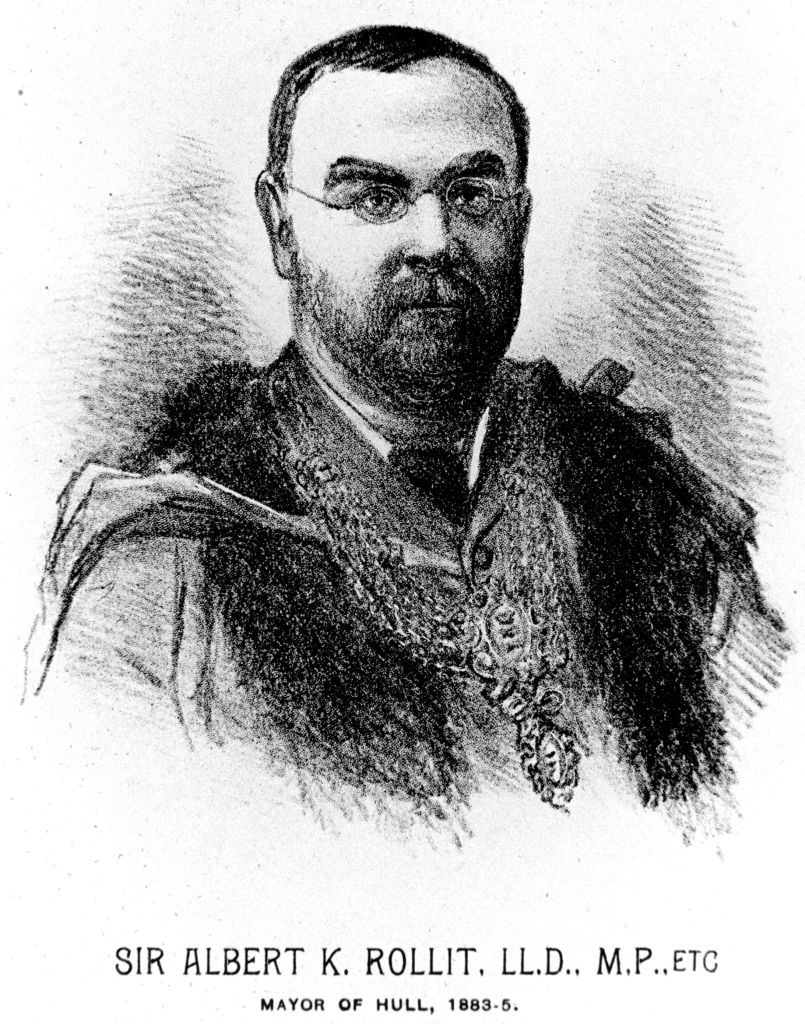
Albert Rollit, Mayor from 1883 to 1885

== Mayors of Kingston-upon-Hull ==
Unless otherwise stated, the following list is from the Hull History Centre.

=== Edward III ===
- 1331 to 1335 Sir William de la Pole
- 1336 John de Barton
- 1337 Robert de Lychefeld
- 1338 Robert de Lychefeld
- 1339 Robert de Upsale
- 1340 Thomas de Yafford
- 1341 Robert Stut
- 1342 Walter Heleward
- 1343 Thomas de Yafford
- 1344 Robert de Lychefeld
- 1345 Robert de Preston
- 1346 Robert de Lychefeld
- 1347 Robert de Lychefeld
- 1348 Alan de Upsale
- 1349 Walter Heleward
- 1350 Gilbert de Birkyn or Birkin
- 1351 Walter Box
- 1352 Adam Pund
- 1353 Galfrid de Hamby
- 1354 Robert Sergeaunt
- 1355 Thomas de Santon
- 1356 Thomas de Santon
- 1357
- 1358 Roger Swerd
- 1359 John Taverner
- 1360 John de Barton
- 1361 Peter de Grymesby
- 1362 Walter Helleward
- 1363 Henry de Selby
- 1364 John de Barton
- 1365 Robert de Selby
- 1366 William de Suayton
- 1367 William de Suayton
- 1368 Walter Box
- 1369 John Lambard
- 1370 Hugh de Hamby
- 1371 Robert de Selby
- 1372 Walter Frost
- 1373 Henry de Selby
- 1374 Robert atte Crosse
- 1375
- 1376 Sir Michael de la Pole

=== Richard II ===
- 1377 Robert del Crosse
- 1378 Sir Thomas de Waltham
- 1379 Richard de Feriby
- 1380 Walter Frost (2)
- 1381 Waltor de Dymelton
- 1382 Robert de Crosse
- 1383 Robert de Crosse
- 1384 John de Dymelton
- 1385 Thomas Waltham
- 1386 Henry de Selby
- 1387 John de Birkyn
- 1388 Walter de Dymelton
- 1389 John de Colthorpe
- 1390 John de Colthorpe
- 1391 Simon de Grymesby
- 1392 Robert Biset
- 1393 Peter Steller
- 1394 Peter Steller
- 1395 John Liversege
- 1396 William Pound (Note: Contradicted by Gent, in Annales Regioduni Hullini) a.k.a. Pund (1)
- 1397 John Liversege
- 1398 William Pound (2) or William Terry
- 1399 John Tuttebury

=== Henry IV ===
- 1400 Simon de Grymesby
- 1401 John Liversege
- 1402 William Terry
- 1403 John Humbleton
- 1404 John Fittling
- 1405 Simon de Grymesby
- 1406 John Fittling (2)
- 1407 Robert Shackells
- 1408 John Tutbury (2)
- 1409 John Wallas
- 1410 Simon Bedall
- 1411 John Wallas (2)

=== Henry V ===
- 1412 John Bedford
- 1413 John Tutbury (3)
- 1414 John Bedford (2)
- 1415 Thomas Marshall
- 1416 John Gregg
- 1417 John Fittling (3)
- 1418 Thomas Marshall (2)
- 1419 Robert Holm
- 1420 John Bedford (2)
- 1421 Francis Hewitt
- 1422 James Spead

=== Henry VI ===
- 1423 Thomas Marshall
- 1424 John Grimsby
- 1425 John Tutbury (4)
- 1426 Thomas Wells
- 1427 Robert Holm (2)
- 1428 John Bedford (4)
- 1429 Robert Kirton
- 1430 Ralph Horn
- 1431 John Grimsby
- 1432 John Tutbury (5)
- 1433 Thomas Wallas
- 1434 Robert Holm (4)
- 1435 John Bedford (5)
- 1436 Robert Kirton (2)
- 1437 Ralph Horn (2)
- 1438 Ralph Holmes
- 1439 John Aldwick or Awnwicke
- 1440 Thomas Day
- 1441 Hugh Clitheroe
- 1442 Ralph Horn (3)
- 1443 John Bedford (6)
- 1444 Thos. Dickinson
- 1445 John Handson
- 1446 Hugh Clitheroe (2)
- 1447 John Steeton
- 1448 Hugh Clitheroe (3)
- 1449 John Scales
- 1450 Rd. Hanson
- 1451 Simon Burton
- 1452 John Spencer
- 1453 Rd. hanson (2)
- 1454 Robert Awnswell
- 1455 Nicholas Ellis
- 1456 John Scales (2)
- 1457 Hugh Citheroe (4)
- 1458 Rd. Hanson (3)
- 1459 Edward Coppindale
- 1460 Rd. Hanson (4)

=== Edward IV ===
- 1461 Nicholas Stubbs
- 1462 John Barker
- 1463 John Green
- 1464 Nicholas Ellis (2)
- 1465 John Swann
- 1466 John Day
- 1467 John Bards
- 1468 Roger Bushel
- 1469 John Day (2)
- 1470 John Hadlesley
- 1471 Robt. Bennington
- 1472 John Whitfield
- 1473 William Brompton
- 1474 John Swann (2)
- 1475 Roger Bushel (2)
- 1476 John Richards
- 1477 Edward Coppindale (2)
- 1478 Thomas Alcock
- 1479 Thomas Wood
- 1480 Robert Alcock
- 1481 Ralph Langton
- 1482 William Baron

=== Richard III ===
- 1483 Thomas Phillips
- 1484 Richard Burdon

=== Henry VII ===
- 1485 Ralph Langton (2)
- 1486 John Chapman
- 1487 John Dalton
- 1488 Thomas Eaton
- 1489 Thomas Dalton
- 1490 Laurence Swatterwick
- 1491 Thomas Phillips (2)
- 1492 Robt. Chapman (2)
- 1493 Thomas Wilson
- 1494 Ralph Langton (2) who died, and John Dalton (2) served.
- 1495 John Dalton (3)
- 1496 Henry Mindram
- 1497 Wm. Goodknap
- 1498 Robert Hoole
- 1499 Thomas Dalton (2)
- 1500 Thos. Gooseman
- 1501 Edward Baron
- 1502 Thomas Cock
- 1503 Robert Garner
- 1504 John Gill
- 1505 Alexander Wharton, who died, and Henry Mindram (2) served.
- 1506 Henry Mindram (3)
- 1507 Thomas Wilkinson
- 1508 Roger Bushell a.k.a. Robert Bushel

=== Henry VIII ===
- 1509 Edward Barron
- 1510 John Elland
- 1511 Robert Harrison
- 1512 William Williamson
- 1513 Edmund Risedale
- 1514 George Mattison
- 1515 Thomas Huntingdon
- 1516 Roger a.k.a. Robert Bushell (2)
- 1517 John Elland (2)
- 1518 Robert Hampson
- 1519 Edward Mattison
- 1520 Thomas Wilkinson (2)
- 1521 John Langton
- 1522 George Mattison (2)
- 1523 Thomas Thompson
- 1524 John Elland (3)
- 1525 William Knowles
- 1526 Robert Parker
- 1527 Thomas Wilkinson (3)
- 1528 Edward Mattison (2)
- 1529 George Mattison (3)
- 1530 Stephen Clare
- 1531 Thomas Thompson (2)
- 1532 William Rogers
- 1533 James Johnson
- 1534 William Knowles (2)
- 1535 Thomas Dalton
- 1536 William Rogers (2)
- 1537 John Harrison
- 1538 John Brown
- 1539 William Catherall
- 1540 Henry Thurcross
- 1541 Sir John Elland, Knt. (4)
- 1542 Peter Mavis or Macas
- 1543 James Rogers
- 1544 Alexander Stockdale
- 1545 James Johnson (2) or Robert Kirkton
- 1546 John Thacker

=== Edward VI ===
- 1547 Thomas Dalton (2)
- 1548 John Harrison (2)
- 1549 Walter Jobson
- 1550 John Oversall a.k.a. John Oversail
- 1551 Alexander Stockdale (2)
- 1552 John Thacker (2)

=== Phillip and Mary ===
- 1553 Henry Thurcross (2)
- 1554 Thomas Dalton, jun.
- 1555 John Thornton
- 1556 Walter Jobson (2)
- 1557 Thomas Dalton (3)

=== Elizabeth I ===
- 1558 Alexander Stockdale (3)
- 1559 James Clarkson
- 1560 Thomas Dalton, jun. (2)
- 1561 Thomas Allured
- 1562 William Gee
- 1563 John Smith
- 1564 Robert Gayton
- 1565 Walter Flinton
- 1566 John Thornton
- 1567 Robert Dalton
- 1568 James Clarkson (2)
- 1569 Thomas Dalton, jun. (3)
- 1570 Laurence Wharton
- 1571 Christopher Stockdale or John Fairweather
- 1572 John Smith (2)
- 1573 William Gee (2)
- 1574 Wm. Williamson
- 1575 Robert Gayton (2)
- 1576 John Fairweather
- 1577 John Thornton (2)
- 1578 James Clarkson (3)
- 1579 John Gregory
- 1580 William Smith
- 1581 Edward Wakefield
- 1582 William Gee (3)
- 1583 John Smith (3)
- 1584 William Wilson
- 1585 Leonard Willan a.k.a. Leonard Wiston
- 1586 Luke Thurcross
- 1587 William Bray
- 1588 Robert Dalton
- 1589 John Gregory
- 1590 William Smith
- 1591 Wm. Richardson
- 1592 Edward Wakefield
- 1593 Anthony Cole
- 1594 Robert Taylor
- 1595 John Lister
- 1596 John Chapman
- 1597 Edward Coke
- 1598 John Graves
- 1599 Anthony Burnsall
- 1600 Hugh Armin
- 1601 Marmaduke Haddlesey
- 1602 William Barnard

=== James I ===
- 1603 Joseph Field
- 1604 Thomas Thackeray
- 1605 James Casson
- 1606 George Almond
- 1607 Thomas Swann
- 1608 Richard Burgess
- 1609 Christopher Chapman
- 1610 James Watkinson
- 1611 James Haddlesey
- 1612 John Lister (2)
- 1613 Nicholas Hansley
- 1614 Joseph Field (2)
- 1615 Barnard Smith
- 1616 Edward Richardson
- 1617 John Preston
- 1618 John Lister, jun.
- 1619 Lancelot Roper
- 1620 Thomas Ferris or Ferres
- 1621 John Hall
- 1622 John Ramsden
- 1623 James Watkinson (2)
- 1624 Thomas Thackeray (2)

=== Charles I ===
- 1625 Thomas Swann
- 1626 Bernard Smith (2)
- 1627 Robert Morton
- 1628 Henry Chambers
- 1629 Sir John Lister (2)
- 1630 Lancelot Roper (2)
- 1631 John Barnard
- 1632 Henry Barnard
- 1633 Thomas Raikes
- 1634 Nicholas Denman
- 1635 Martin Jefferson
- 1636 Joseph Blaides
- 1637 John Ramsden (2)
- 1638 William Popple
- 1639 Robert Morton (2)
- 1640 John Barnard (2)
- 1641 Henry Barnard (2)
- 1642 Thomas Raikes (2)
- 1643 Thomas Raikes (3)
- 1644 Nicholas Denman (2)
- 1645 John Chambers
- 1646 William Peck
- 1647 William Dobson
- 1648 John Ramsden, jun.

=== Commonwealth ===
- 1649 Peregrine Pelham
- 1650 Francis Dewick
- 1651 John Kay
- 1652 John Rogers
- 1653 Richard Wood
- 1654 Robert Ripley
- 1655 William Maister
- 1656 Robert Berrier
- 1657 William Foxley
- 1658 William Dobson (2)
- 1659 William Ramsden
- 1660 Christopher Richardson

=== Charles II ===
- 1661 George Crowle
- 1662 Richard Wilson
- 1663 Richard Robinson
- 1664 William Skinner
- 1665 Robert Bloom
- 1666 Richard Frank
- 1667 Anthony Lambert
- 1668 Humphrey Duncalf
- 1669 John Tripp
- 1670 George Acklam
- 1671 Robert Berrier (2)
- 1672 Thomas Johnson
- 1673 John Rogers
- 1674 Daniel Hoar
- 1675 William Shires
- 1676 William Foxley (2)
- 1677 Henry Maister
- 1678 Christopher Richardson (2)
- 1679 George Crowle (2)
- 1680 Simon Sisson
- 1681 Robert Mason
- 1682 Joseph Ellis, who died, and Anthony Lambert served.
- 1683 Francis Delacamp
- 1684 John Field

=== James II ===
- 1685 John Forcett
- 1686 Philip Wilkinson
- 1687 Robert Carlisle
- 1688 Francis Delacamp (2)

=== William and Mary ===
- 1689 Robert Trippet
- 1690 Anthony Iveson
- 1691 Richard Gray
- 1692 George Bacchus
- 1693 Richard Ellis
- 1694 Henry Maister (2)
- 1695 Simon Sisson (2)
- 1696 Robert Mason
- 1697 Robert Nettleton
- 1698 William Mould
- 1699 Sir William St Quintin, 3rd Baronet
- 1700 Daniel Hoar (3)
- 1701 Philip Wilkinson (2)

=== Anne ===
- 1702 Robert Carlisle (2)
- 1703 William Hydes
- 1704 Samuel Boyse
- 1705 Robert Trippet (2)
- 1706 Richard Gray (2)
- 1707 Erasmus Darwin
- 1708 Andrew Perrot
- 1709 William Fenwick
- 1710 Towers Wallis
- 1711 John Somerscales
- 1712 Benjamin Ward
- 1713 John Collings

=== George I ===
- 1714 William Mould (2)
- 1715 Sir William St Quintin (2)
- 1716 Leonard Collings
- 1717 William Cogan
- 1718 Samuel Boyse (2)
- 1719 Johanan Beilby
- 1720 Erasmus Darwin (2)
- 1721 Andrew Perrot (2)
- 1722 William Wilberforce (grandfather of anti-slavery activist William Wilberforce)
- 1723 George Green
- 1724 William Ashmole
- 1725 John Somerscales (2)
- 1726 John Collings (2)

=== George II ===
- 1727 William Fenwick (2)
- 1728 Thomas Scott
- 1729 Leonard Collings (2)
- 1730 Rd. Williamson
- 1731 Samuel Watson
- 1732 John Monckton
- 1733 Joseph Lasenby
- 1734 William Mowld
- 1735 William Cornwall
- 1736 William Cogan (2)
- 1737 Christopher Heron
- 1738 Andrew Perrott
- 1739 Johanan Beilby (2)
- 1740 William Wilberforce (2)
- 1741 John Porter
- 1742 James Shaw
- 1743 William Ashmole, who died, and Andrew Perrot served.
- 1744 John Froggatt
- 1745 William Cookson
- 1746 Josiah Robinson
- 1747 Henry Etherington
- 1748 John Wood
- 1749 Francis de la Pryme
- 1750 Thomas Scott (2)
- 1751 Samuel Watson (2)
- 1752 Christopher Heron (2)
- 1753 Geo. Thompson
- 1754 Andrew Perrott (2)
- 1755 John Porter, who died, and James Shaw was chosen.
- 1756 William Hall
- 1757 William Cookson (2)
- 1758 Henry Etherington (2)
- 1759 John Wood (2)

=== George III ===
- 1760 Richard Bell
- 1781 Joseph Sykes
- 1762 Charles Pool
- 1763 Christopher Scott
- 1764 Thomas Mowld
- 1765 John Booth
- 1766 Francis de la Pryme (2)
- 1767 George Thompson (2), died in mayoralty, and Richard Bell (2) served the remainder of the time.
- 1768 John Melling
- 1769 Henry Etherington
- 1770 John Porter
- 1771 Benjamin Blaydes
- 1772 John Mace
- 1773 Richard Bell (3)
- 1774 Ralph Darling
- 1775 Joseph Outram
- 1776 Charles Pool (2)
- 1777 Joseph Sykes (2)
- 1778 Chris. Scott (2)
- 1779 B. B. Thompson
- 1780 Edmund Bramston
- 1781 Edward Coulson
- 1782 John Booth (2)
- 1783 John Melling (2)
- 1784 Henry Broadley
- 1785 Sir Henry Etherrington (2)
- 1786 William Osbourne
- 1787 John Porter (2)
- 1788 Benjamin Blaydes (2)
- 1789 John Banks
- 1790 Ralph Darling (2)
- 1791 B. B. Thompson (2)
- 1792 John Sykes
- 1793 John Wray
- 1794 William W. Bolton or Boulton
- 1795 Samuel Standidge
- 1796 William Osbourne (2)
- 1797 John Banks (2) died and John Sykes (2) succeeded.
- 1798 Joseph Egginton
- 1799 John Bateman
- 1800 William Jarratt
- 1801 E. F. Coulson
- 1802 William W. Bolton (2)
- 1803 John Wray (2)
- 1804 Joseph Egginton
- 1805 William Jarratt (2)
- 1806 Richard W. Moxon
- 1807 Nicholas Sykes
- 1808 Andrew Hollingworth
- 1809 E. F. Coulson (2)
- 1810 Richard W. Moxon (2)
- 1811 George Schonswar
- 1812 Andrew Hollingworth (2), he died, and J. Wray was elected.
- 1813 John Carrick
- 1814 William Hall
- 1815 Chris. Bolton
- 1816 Nicholas Sykes (2)
- 1817 George Schonswar (2)
- 1818 William Hall (2)
- 1819 John Carrick (2)

=== George IV ===
- 1820 H Thompson
- 1821 Charles Whitaker
- 1822 Chris. Bolton (2)
- 1823 Charles Whitaker (2)
- 1824 William W. Bolton (3)
- 1825 George Coulson
- 1826 William Jarratt (3)
- 1827 Avison Terry
- 1828 George Coulson (2)
- 1829 Avison Terry (2)

=== William IV ===
- 1830 William Hall (3)
- 1831 Robert Raikes
- 1832 John Barkworth
- 1833 T. B. Locke
- 1834 Edward Gibson
- 1835 John C. Parkers (elected January 1st)
- 1836 Boswell Middleton Jalland (elected November 9th)

=== Victoria ===
- 1837 George Cookman
- 1838 George Cookman (2)
- 1839 Wm. Lowthrop
- 1840 M. Chalmers
- 1841 Thos. Thompson
- 1842 John Atkinson
- 1843 William Baldwin Carrick
- 1844 Joseph Jones
- 1845 John Gresham
- 1846 B. M. Jalland (2)
- 1847 John Lee Smith
- 1848 John Lee Smith (2)
- 1849 Thomas William Palmer
- 1850 Thomas William Palmer (2)
- 1851 Anthony Bannister
- 1852 Henry Blundell
- 1853 Henry Cooper
- 1854 Sir Henry Cooper, (2)
- 1855 Anthony Bannister (2)
- 1856 William Henry Moss
- 1857 Thos. Thompson (2)
- 1858 Martin Samuelson
- 1859 Zachariah Charles Pearson
- 1860 William Hodge
- 1861 Zachariah Charles Pearson (2)
- 1862 William Henry Moss (2)
- 1862 William Hodge (2)
- 1862 William Henry Moss (3)
- 1863 John Lumsden
- 1864 Henry John Atkinson
- 1865 Henry John Atkinson (2)
- 1866 John Loft
- 1867 George Christopher Roberts
- 1868 John Bryson
- 1869 Thomas Witty
- 1870 Robert Jameson
- 1871 Robert Jameson (2)
- 1872 Robert Jameson (3)
- 1873 John Love Seaton
- 1874 Charles Wells
- 1875 Kelburne King,
- 1876 Kelburne King, (2).
- 1877 Robert Waller
- 1878 Robert Waller (2)
- 1879 Kelburne King (3)
- 1880 John Leak
- 1881 John Leak (2)
- 1882 John Leak (3)
- 1883 Albert Kaye Rollit
- 1884 Albert Kaye Rollit (2)
- 1885 John Green Wills Willows
- 1886 John Leak (4)
- 1887 Henry Toozes
- 1888 John Sherhurn,
- 1889 John Sherburn(2)
- 1890 James Thos. Woodhouse
- 1891 Edward Robson
- 1892 George Hall
- 1893 Charles Richardson
- 1894 Charles Richardson (2)
- 1895 Charles Richardson (3)
- 1896 Henry Morrill
- 1897 Philip Thomas Crook
- 1898 (William) Alfred Gelder
- 1899 Alfred Gelder (2)
- 1900 Alfred Gelder (3)

=== Edward VII ===
- 1901 Alfred Gelder (4)
- 1902 Sir Alfred Gelder (5)
- 1903 William Jarman
- 1904 Frederick Larard
- 1905 Frederick Larard (2)
- 1906 Henry Feldman
- 1907 Henry Feldman (2)
- 1908 Henry Feldman (3)
- 1909 Henry Feldman (4)
- 1910 Thomas Shemelds Taylor

=== George V ===
- 1911 Thomas Shemelds Taylor (2)
- 1912 John Brown Lord Mayors
- 1913 John Henry Hargreaves

== Lord Mayors of Kingston-upon-Hull ==
Unless stated, the following list is from the Hull History Centre.

=== George V ===
- 1914 John Henry Hargreaves (2) (first Lord Mayor)
- 1915 John Henry Hargreaves (3)
- 1916 Francis Askew
- 1917 Hubert Johnson
- 1918 Peter Gaskell
- 1919 Thomas George Hall
- 1920 Thomas Beecroft Atkinson
- 1921 George Frederick Wokes
- 1922 Charles Raine
- 1923 Edward Ernest Keighley
- 1924 Albert Digby Willoughby
- 1925 Frank Finn
- 1926 Watson Boyes
- 1927 Herbert Dean
- 1928 Benno Pearlman
- 1929 Richard Richardson
- 1930 Robert Mell
- 1931 Robert Walter Wheeldon
- 1932 John Malcolm Dossor
- 1933 Arthur Shepherd
- 1934 Archibald Stark
- 1935 Frederick Till

=== Edward VIII ===
- 1936 Frederick Holmes

=== George VI ===
- 1937 Frederick Ernest Woodliffe
- 1938 William Pashby
- 1939 Henry Melville Harrison
- 1940 Sydney Herbert Smith
- 1941 John Guy Hewett
- 1942 Joseph Leopold Schultz
- 1943 Frederick Roland Fryer
- 1944 John Dewick Lambert Nicholson
- 1945 Herbert Harrison
- 1946 Isaac Robinson
- 1947 Thomas Radcliffe-Broadbent
- 1949 John Henson
- 1950 Henry James Barney
- 1951 Ralph Edward Smith
- 1952 Alfred Kyno Jacobs

=== Elizabeth II ===
- 1953 Arthur Richardson
- 1954 Herbert Wilfred Jackson
- 1955 William Fox
- 1956 Harry Kneeshaw
- 1957 Thomas Wilcock
- 1958 Lawrence Science
- 1959 Thomas Henry Wray
- 1959 Lawrence Science (2)
- 1960 William Edmund Body
- 1961 Kenneth Turner
- 1962 George Frear
- 1963 James Gordon Edmond Teskey-King
- 1964 Fred Hammond
- 1965 Annie Major (first woman Lord Mayor)
- 1966 Reginald Welsh Buckle
- 1967 Herbert Walford Anderson
- 1968 William Birkhead
- 1969 Maude Heath
- 1970 Rupert Alec-Smith
- 1971 James Campbell
- 1972 Lionel Rosen
- 1973 James William Smith
- 1974 Laurence Johnson
- 1975 Catherine Eliza Ellis
- 1976 Albert Parker
- 1977 Ernest Kirkwood
- 1978 George William Goforth
- 1979 Maurice Rawling
- 1980 Alexander Frank Clarke
- 1981 Phyllis Clarke
- 1982 Harry Woodford
- 1983 Louis Pearlman
- 1984 Frances Brady
- 1985 James McKinnon Paton
- 1986 Alfred William Bowd
- 1987 Violet Alice Mitchell
- 1988 Marjorie Smelt
- 1989 John Stanley
- 1990 Leslie Albert Taylor
- 1991 Dennis Woods
- 1992 Dennis Barber
- 1993 Leonard Harvey
- 1994 Mima Bell
- 1995 John Arthur Black
- 1996 James Sidney Mulgrove
- 1997 Gordon Boyce Caselton
- 1998 Brian Arthur Petch
- 1999 Brian Stephen Wilkinson
- 2000 Beattie Ware
- 2001 Frederick Rowland Beedle
- 2002 Terence Geraghty
- 2003 Kenneth Branson
- 2004 John Logan Fareham
- 2005 Bryan Anthony Bradley
- 2006 Trevor Peter Larsen
- 2007 Brenda Petch
- 2008 Elaine Garland
- 2009 Karen Woods
- 2010 David Gemmell
- 2011 Colin Inglis
- 2012 Daniel Brown
- 2013 Nadine Fudge
- 2014 Mary Glew
- 2015 Anita Harrison
- 2016 Sean Chaytor
- 2017 John Hewitt
- 2018 Pete Allen
- 2019 Steve Wilson (Note: Term extended to September 2020 because of COVID-19 pandemic)
- 2020 Lynn Petrini (Note: From September 2020)
- 2021 Lynn Petrini
- 2022 Christine Randall

=== Charles III ===
- 2023 Kalvin Neal
- 2024 Mark Collinson
- 2025 Cheryl Payne
- 2026 Maria Coward

== See also ==
- List of sheriffs of Kingston upon Hull
- List of stewards of Kingston upon Hull
