= John Bedford (disambiguation) =

John Bedford (c. 1720–1791) was an English industrialist.

John Bedford may also refer to:

- John Bedford (fl. 1391), MP for Lewes
- John Bedford (died 1451), MP for Kingston upon Hull
- John Bedford (Wesleyan) (1810–1879), English Wesleyan minister
