= Thomas Kirkby =

Thomas Kirkby may refer to:

- Thomas Kirkby (MP for Kingston upon Hull), 1391-1411
- Thomas Kirkby (MP for Totnes), MP in May 1421 for Totnes
- Thomas Kirkby (painter), 1775–1847, painter and draughtsman

== See also ==
- Thomas Kirby (disambiguation)
