= Streetlife Museum of Transport =

Coordinates: 53°44′38″N 0°19′47″W

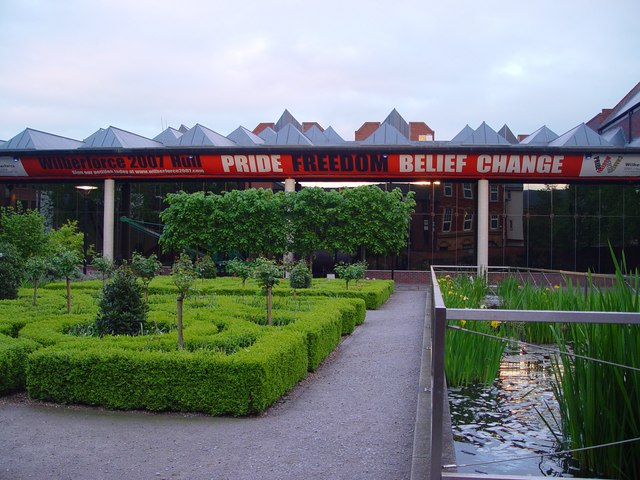
- Established: 1989
- Location: Kingston upon Hull, England
- Type: Transport museum
- Collection size: 12,500 objects
- Visitors: 125,876 (2006-2007)
- Public transit access: Hull Paragon Interchange (10 minute walk)
- Website: www.hullmuseums.co.uk/streetlife-museum

The Streetlife Museum of Transport is a transport museum located in Kingston upon Hull, England. The roots of the collection date back to the early 20th century, however the purpose-built museum the collection is housed in was opened in 1989 by the then Hull East MP, John Prescott. Core areas of the collection include Veteran cars, horse-drawn carriages and objects relating to local public transport.

The museum forms part of the Museums Quarter in Hull, based on the historic High Street in the Old Town of the city. The Museums Quarter comprises the Streetlife Museum, the Hull and East Riding Museum (archaeology), the Arctic Corsair trawler and Wilberforce House Museum. The site is managed by Hull Museums, a department of Hull City Council on behalf of the people of the city.

== Galleries ==
The museum has a range of scenic galleries, displaying the objects in a visual context to assist with interpretation without the need for a high volume of written interpretation. It also has over 200 years worth of motor transports.

== Visiting the museum ==
Opening hours are 10 a.m. to 4.30 p.m. Monday to Saturday and 11 a.m. to 4 p.m. on Sundays. Admission to the museum is free.
