= List of Northern Colorado Bears head football coaches =

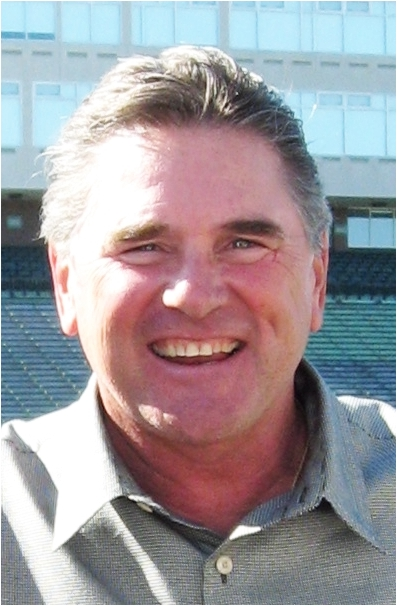
Head coach Joe Glenn led the Bears to two consecutive NCAA Division II National Football Championship titles.

The Northern Colorado Bears football program is a college football team that represents University of Northern Colorado in the Big Sky Conference, a part of the NCAA Division I Football Championship. The team has had 18 head coaches since its first recorded football game in 1892. Since December 2022, Ed Lamb has served as Northern Colorado's head coach.

Four coaches have led Northern Colorado in the postseason: John W. Hancock, Bob Blasi, Joe Glenn, and Kay Dalton. Four of those coaches also won conference championships: Hancock and Blasi each captured two as a member of the Rocky Mountain Athletic Conference. Blasi captured an additional three as a member of the Great Plains Athletic Conference and one as a member of the North Central Conference. Glenn captured four and Dalton one as a member of the Big Sky. Glenn also captured two national championships as head coach at Northern Colorado in 1996 and 1997.

Blasi is the leader in seasons coached, with 19 years as head coach and games coached (181) and won (107). Glenn has the highest winning percentage at .737. John Lister has the lowest winning percentage of those who have coached more than one game, with .000.

== Key ==
Key to symbols in coaches list
General		Overall		Conference		Postseason (Note: Although the first Rose Bowl Game was played in 1902, it has been continuously played since the 1916 game, and is recognized as the oldest bowl game by the NCAA. "—" indicates any season prior to 1916 when postseason games were not played.)	
No.	Order of coaches (Note: A running total of the number of head coaches, with coaches who served separate tenures being counted only once. Interim head coaches are represented with "Int" and are not counted in the running total. "—" indicates the team played but either without a coach or no coach is on record. "X" indicates an interim year without play.)	GC	Games coached	CW	Conference wins	PW	Postseason wins
DC	Division championships	OW	Overall wins	CL	Conference losses	PL	Postseason losses
CC	Conference championships	OL	Overall losses	CT	Conference ties	PT	Postseason ties
NC	National championships	OT	Overall ties (Note: Overtime rules in college football were introduced in 1996, making ties impossible in the period since.)	C%	Conference winning percentage		
†	Elected to the College Football Hall of Fame	O%	Overall winning percentage (Note: When computing the win–loss percentage, a tie counts as half a win and half a loss.)				

== Coaches ==
List of head football coaches showing season(s) coached, overall records, conference records (Note: Northern Colorado has been a member of Big Sky Conference since the 2006 season.), postseason records, championships and selected awards (Note: Statistics correct as of the end of the 2025 NCAA Division I FCS football season.)
No.	Name	Season(s) (Note: Northern Colorado did not field teams for the 1894, 1898, 1901–1904, 1906–1916, 1944–1945, and 2020 seasons.)	GC	OW	OL	OT	O%	CW	CL	CT	C%	PW	PL	PT	CCs	NCs	Awards
0	Unknown	1892; 1897	2	0	2	0	.000	—	—	—	—	—	—	—	—	0	—
1	John Lister	1893; 1895–1896	4	0	4	0	.000	—	—	—	—	—	—	—	—	0	—
2	Arthur Kendel	1899–1900	7	1	4	2	0.286	—	—	—	—	—	—	—	—	0	—
3	Samuel E. Abbott	1905	4	0	2	2	0.250	—	—	—	—	—	—	—	—	0	—
4	Ralph Glaze	1917–1918	9	2	7	0	0.222	—	—	—	—	—	—	—	—	0	—
5	William E. Search	1919–1921	12	1	10	1	0.125	—	—	—	—	—	—	—	—	0	—
6	George E. Cooper	1922–1927	47	15	29	3	0.351	4	15	0	0.211	—	—	—	0	0	—
7	Bill Saunders	1928–1931	29	12	13	4	0.483	10	12	1	0.457	—	—	—	0	0	—
8	John W. Hancock	1932–1943; 1946–1953	160	77	78	5	0.497	44	38	3	0.535	0	1	0	2	0	—
9	Joe Lindahl	1954–1962	83	35	44	4	0.446	16	28	3	0.372	0	0	0	0	0	—
10	William C. Heiss	1963–1965	28	12	14	2	0.464	5	5	0	0.500	0	0	0	0	0	—
11	Bob Blasi	1966–1984	181	107	71	3	0.599	50	22	0	0.694	0	1	0	6	0	—
12	Ron Simonson	1985–1988	43	13	30	0	0.302	11	25	0	0.306	0	0	0	0	0	—
13	Joe Glenn	1989–1999	133	98	35	0	0.737	70	28	0	0.714	10	5	0	4	2 – 1996; 1997	—
14	Kay Dalton	2000–2005	69	38	31	—	0.551	17	18	—	0.486	2	1	0	1	0	—
15	Scott Downing	2006–2010	56	9	47	—	0.161	5	35	—	0.125	0	0	0	0	0	—
16	Earnest Collins Jr.	2011–2019	100	28	72	—	0.280	19	53	—	0.264	0	0	0	0	0	—
17	Ed McCaffrey	2020–2022	22	6	16	—	0.273	4	12	—	0.250	0	0	0	0	0	—
18	Ed Lamb	2023–present	35	5	30	—	0.143	3	21	—	0.125	0	0	0	0	0	—
