= List of sheriffs and stewards of Kingston upon Hull =

This is a list of lists of sheriffs and stewards of Kingston upon Hull:

- List of sheriffs of Kingston upon Hull
- List of stewards of Kingston upon Hull
