= John Lister (died 1640) =

British merchant and politician (1587–1640)

John Lister (1587–1640) was an English merchant and politician who sat in the House of Commons variously between 1621 and 1640.

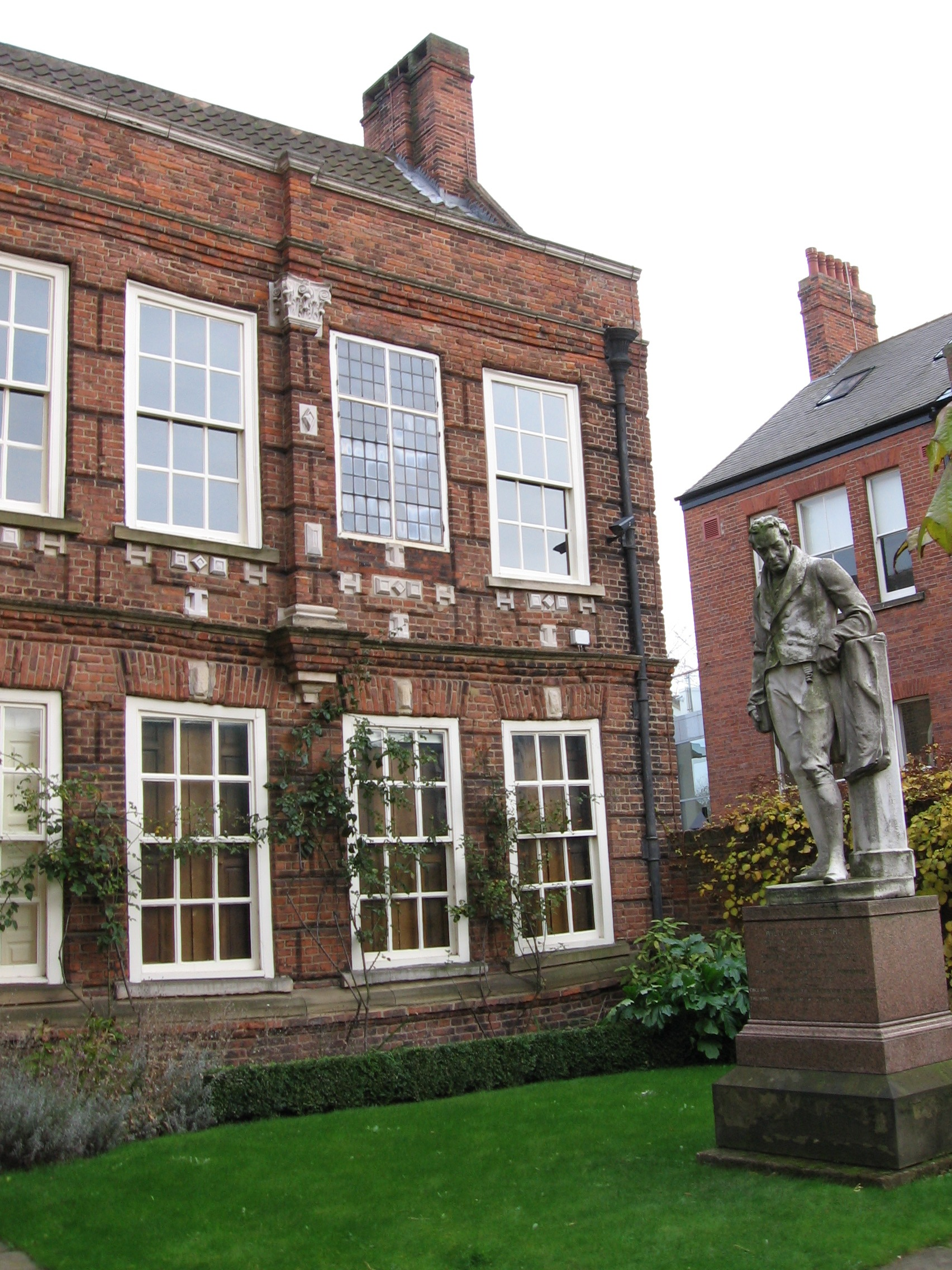
Wilberforce House, Hull – home of the Lister family

Lister was the son of John Lister, a lead merchant of Hull who was mayor and MP for the town.

Lister succeeded his father and in 1618 also became Mayor of Hull and in 1621 was also elected Member of Parliament for Kingston upon Hull (Hull). He was re-elected in subsequent elections until King Charles I decided to rule without parliament in 1629. In 1629 Lister was again mayor of Hull and was knighted in 1632. In 1639 Lister entertained King Charles to a sumptuous dinner at his house in High Street.

In April 1640, Lister was re-elected MP for Hull in the Short Parliament and was re-elected in November 1640 for the Long Parliament. However he died in December.

Lister funded a hospital, which opened in 1641, for twelve elderly people, with rooms for a lecturer.

The house of the Lister family is now a museum known as the Wilberforce House Museum.

Parliament of England
| Preceded by Sir John Bourchier; Richard Burgis | Member of Parliament for Kingston upon Hull; 1621–1629; With: Maurice Abbot 1621–1625; Lancelot Roper 1626; James Watkinson 1628–1629 | Parliament suspended until 1640 |
| Vacant Parliament suspended since 1629 | Member of Parliament for Kingston upon Hull; April 1640 – December 1640; With: Henry Vane, junior | Succeeded by Henry Vane, junior Peregrine Pelham |
