= John Spalding =

John Spalding may refer to:

- John Spalding (14th-century MP) (fl. 1379–1399), English politician
- John Spalding (historian) (fl. 1650), Scottish historian
- John Spalding (Ninety Pound Wuss) (fl. 1997–2000), American musician
- John Spalding (priest) (c. 1418 – after 1487), Scottish Catholic clergyman
- John Spalding (Scottish politician) (1763–1815), Scottish politician
- John Franklin Spalding (1828–1902), missionary bishop of the Episcopal Church in the United States
- John Lancaster Spalding (1840–1916), American Catholic prelate
- John M. Spalding (1914–1959), American military officer and politician
- J. Mark Spalding (born 1965), American Catholic prelate
- John Spalding (Massachusetts judge) (1897–1979), justice of the Massachusetts Supreme Judicial Court

== See also ==
- John Spaulding (disambiguation)
