= John Eland =

John Eland may refer to:

- John Eland (chemist)
- John Eland (MP) (died 1542)
