= Simon Grimsby =

Simon Grimsby may refer to:

- Simon Grimsby (MP for Kingston upon Hull) (fl. 1381–1394), MP for Kingston upon Hull
- Simon Grimsby (MP for Great Grimsby) (1367-after 1407), MP for and mayor of Great Grimsby
