= List of stewards of Kingston upon Hull =

High Steward of Kingston upon Hull is a ceremonial title conferred by Hull City Council as a civic honour on prominent people associated with Kingston upon Hull. Hull has had a high steward since at least 1583. The position was abolished in 1974 and revived in 2013. Before 1974 the steward usually served for life; since 2013 the term of office is 10 years. In 2013, Peter Mandelson was appointed as the most recent High Steward of Kingston upon Hull. In September 2025, following the Jeffrey Epstein revelations, he was stripped of the role.

== History ==
A town's steward mirrored at local level the Lord High Steward at national level. According to James Joseph Sheahan, "The dignity of Lord High Steward of Kingston-upon-Hull was formerly of great importance", but after the Municipal Corporations Act 1835 became "little more than honorary". The corporation hoped to pick an influential figure as steward; conversely, the steward often influenced the choice for MPs for Hull. The steward was paid a regular fee and received gifts of ale. The 1661 city charter made the position in the gift of the monarch, permitting the council to petition the monarch to award the title to a member of the Privy Council. His duties in 1864 were "to present such addresses to the reigning Monarch as the Corporation may adopt, and to watch over the interests of the borough in the Privy Council". Hull's first steward whose name is known was Sir Francis Walsingham, principal secretary to Queen Elizabeth I. Sheahan says the previous steward died in 1582, but his name was not recorded. Allison says the office of lord high steward was instituted in 1584, and first mentioned in the town charter of 1598. In 1833, the stewardship fell vacant in the divisive aftermath of the Reform Act 1832; the Mayor and Aldermen of the Corporation petitioned to have the Arthur Wellesley, 1st Duke of Wellington appointed, while the burgesses made a counter-petition in favour of John Lambton, 1st Earl of Durham; Durham was finally appointed after the Municipal Corporations Act 1835. Other stewards have included the Georgian-era prime minister Lord Rockingham, Hull businessman and MP Thomas Robinson Ferens, and Herbert Morrison (1956–65), a former Labour home secretary, and grandfather of Peter Mandelson, a successor.

The Local Government Act 1888 redesignated the borough of Hull a county borough which retained its civic officers. The Local Government Act 1972 abolished the county borough and officers from April 1974.

In 2012, Hull City Council issued a "loyal address" to mark Elizabeth II's diamond jubilee asking for permission to revive the offices of High Sheriff and High Steward. When this was granted in 2013, the council commissioned a new chain of office for the High Steward. The chain were funded by a bequest from Colonel Rupert Alexander Alec-Smith, who had served as Sheriff of Hull between 1949 and 1950, Lord Mayor of Hull in 1970 and 1971, and Lord Lieutenant of Humberside in 1980–83. The first appointee was former Labour minister Peter Mandelson, grandson of previous steward Herbert Morrison. John Prescott, a Labour rival of Mandelson who was MP for Kingston upon Hull East from 1970 to 2010, said he was surprised it had not been discussed with him, adding "I also have no interest in being a steward again - I did that job on the liners for 10 years." Following Mandelson's connections to the paedophile financier Jeffrey Epstein, which led to his sacking as ambassador to the United States by Prime Minister Keir Starmer on 11 September 2025, key figures at Hull City Council called for him to be stripped of the post. On 18 September 2025, councillors of Hull City Council unanimously voted to strip him of his role as High Steward of Kingston upon Hull.

== List ==
The list of stewards whose names are known is as follows. Unless noted, those appointed up to 1974 held office for life.

- 1583 Sir Francis Walsingham
- 1590 Sir Thomas Heneage
- 1596 Sir Robert Cecil, afterwards Earl of Salisbury
- 1612 Thomas, Lord Ellesmere, afterwards Viscount Brackley
- 1626 George Abbot, Archbishop of Canterbury
- 1633 Thomas Coventry, 1st Baron Coventry
- 1639 Thomas Wentworth, 1st Earl of Strafford
- 1661 George Monck, 1st Duke of Albemarle
- 1670 John Belasyse, 1st Baron Belasyse resigned under the Test Act
- 1673 James Scott, 1st Duke of Monmouth
- 1682 Thomas Hickman-Windsor, 1st Earl of Plymouth also Governor and Recorder
- 1688 Henry Jermyn, 1st Baron Dover resigned after the Glorious Revolution
- 1689 William Pierrepont, 4th Earl of Kingston-upon-Hull
- 1691 Thomas Osborne, Marquess of Carmarthen, afterwards Duke of Leeds. The office was vacant from his death in 1712.
- 1766 Charles Watson-Wentworth, 2nd Marquess of Rockingham
- 1786 Francis Osborne, 5th Duke of Leeds (as Marquess of Carmarthen until 1789)
- 1799 William Fitzwilliam, 4th Earl Fitzwilliam
- 1835 John Lambton, 1st Earl of Durham
- 1840 Constantine Phipps, 1st Marquess of Normanby
- 1863 George Robinson, 3rd Earl de Grey and 2nd Earl of Ripon, later Marquess of Ripon
- 1911 Thomas Ferens
- 1956 Herbert Morrison, later Baron Morison of Lambeth
- 1974–2012 position abolished
- 2013–2025 Peter Mandelson, Baron Mandelson
- 2025–present position vacant

== See also ==
- List of mayors of Kingston upon Hull
- List of sheriffs of Kingston upon Hull
