= Daniel Sykes =

British Member of Parliament (1766–1832)

- Daniel Sykes MP, 1825 engraving

MP for Kingston upon Hull
- In office 1820–1830

MP for Beverley
- In office 1830–1831

Personal details
- Born: 12 November 1776
- Died: 24 January 1832 (aged 55)
- Party: Whig

Daniel Sykes (12 November 1766 – 24 January 1832) was an English politician who served as a Member of Parliament in the 19th century.

== Life ==
He was born into the Sykes family of West Ella, the Whig branch of the descendants of Richard Sykes of Kingston upon Hull (1678–1726). He was the fifth of six sons of Joseph Sykes of West Ella and his wife Dorothy née Twiggs, and brother of Mary Anne Sykes who married Henry Thornton MP.

Sykes was educated at Pocklington School by the Rev. Miles Popple, a Cambridge graduate (B.A. 1778). He matriculated in 1784 at Trinity College, Cambridge, where Popple had become a Fellow in 1780, graduating B.A. in 1788, M.A. in 1781; he became himself a Fellow of Trinity in 1790.

In 1787 Sykes entered the Middle Temple, and in 1793 he was called to the bar. He joined the family business Joseph Sykes and Co., iron-merchants in Hull, gave up his college fellowship and married in 1795, and pursued a career as a barrister. After a serious illness, he left London and settled for life as a provincial barrister in Hull. He founded a primary school, the first in Hull. He was elected recorder of Hull in 1817, and retired as a lawyer about a year later, concentrating on wide political interests in Yorkshire. He was involved in setting up the Rockingham and Hull Weekly Advertiser in 1808, with other members of the family and John Cowham Parker (1773–1841) of the Hull Dock Company. The founding editor was William Spence, followed by the Rev. Sir George Lee, 6th Baronet.

== Politics ==
From the early 19th century, Daniel Sykes carried out political work on behalf of Whig and reforming candidates, in Hull and more widely in Yorkshire. After nearly two decades, he was a candidate himself, elected Member of Parliament for Hull in 1820.

=== Political agent ===
Sykes became involved in the politics of the Kingston upon Hull constituency as a political agent acting for William Fitzwilliam, 4th Earl Fitzwilliam. His father, who died in 1803, backed the Rockingham Whigs, and Earl Fitzwilliam was the nephew of the Marquess of Rockingham. The Hull electorate in the two-member constituency favoured "third man" candidacies that meant high local election expenditure. John Staniforth was elected in 1802 on that basis: his family background was Hull shipbuilding, and his uncle Philip Green held a grudge against the sitting member Samuel Thornton. In 1806 Sykes, against Earl Fitzwilliam's wishes, proposed on the hustings William Joseph Denison, without Denison's knowledge. The result was that Denison was elected, dislodging Thornton until 1807.

In the 1807 general election, Thornton was returned for Surrey. Daniel and Richard Sykes intrigued to have William Wilberforce stand for Hull, paving the way for Viscount Milton, Fitzwilliam's son, to take over Wilberforce's Yorkshire seat. The plan for Wilberforce to enter as "third man" failed, after Thornton and Denison withdrew. Fitzwilliam's candidate Viscount Mahon was elected with Staniforth, without a contest.

At the 1812 general election the Fitzwilliam interest failed to gain a Hull seat, as George William Denys came in as a "third man". In 1818 Staniforth was unseated, behind the Tory John Mitchell and the Whig reformer James Robert George Graham backed by the Sykeses and funded by large sums from Fitzwilliam.

=== Member of Parliament ===
For the 1820 election after the death of George III, Graham did not want to stand again, citing the expense. Richard Sykes conferred with Fitzwilliam and the Whig leader George Tierney; the prospective candidate Pascoe Grenfell went elsewhere, and Hull alderman Edward Anderson refused the chance. Richard Sykes had promised brother Daniel Sykes as a stopgap: he had refused an offer at Liverpool, but was elected with Mitchell. There was no contest, but the hustings became violent as Mitchell became a target, and supporters of the radical Thomas Jonathan Wooler showed themselves. Once elected, he sold his shares in the Rockingham Hull newspaper; it continued to be supportive, while at the following election the Hull Advertiser criticised him as an opponent of electoral bribery. In his maiden speech, he addressed as an anomaly the electoral standing of some Hull voters, who were not able to vote also in the Yorkshire county elections because of Hull's status as "county of itself".

Sykes gave consistent support in the House of Commons to the Whig opposition. He supported free trade, Catholic relief and the abolition of slavery. In poor health in 1825, he was reluctant to continue, citing to John Smith the high costs of buying Hull votes. Smith introduced him to Henry Brougham. As a result, Sykes became a founding shareholder in London University. He also was the first president of the Hull Mechanics' institute, and was president too of Hull's Anti-Slavery Society and Auxiliary Peace Society.

In 1826 Sykes did stand again successfully for Hull; but at the death of George IV he was out of favour in Hull for his views, and failed to be nominated for Yorkshire. He stood instead at another venal borough, Beverley, where he had campaigned in past, and where John Wharton, a Foxite Whig and past MP, was now in the King's Bench Prison for debt. At the election, in the two-member constituency, Henry Burton-Peters was clearly first, but Sykes refused to pay for freedom of the borough as was customary. He had a close contest for second place with the Tory Capel Cure II (1797–1878) of Blake Hall, a slave-owner in Jamaica, and grandfather of Arthur Capel-Cure, founder of the stockbrokers now known as Capel-Cure Myers.

== Last years and death ==
Daniel Sykes did not stand again for Beverley in the 1831 general election, but backed the reformer William Marshall who was elected ahead of Burton-Peters. In poor health, he turned down an offer to stand for Yorkshire, not ruling out a future candidacy; he also gave up his position as recorder. With a diagnosis of cancer in summer 1831, he died in January 1832. His estate was divided between his wife Isabella and his brothers Richard and Henry and their families.

In 1834 George Pryme published privately a memoir of Sykes.

== Family ==
Mrs Daniel Sykes, lithograph of portrait by John Partridge

Sykes married in 1795 Isabella Wright, daughter of Matthew Wright of Stamford Bridge. The couple had no children.

Of the Hull merchant class, Ward wrote "A few merchant families such as the Maisters, Sykes and Broadleys established estates in the surrounding countryside and considered themselves gentry." He called Daniel Sykes "popular and hardworking", but noted that he left few political papers.

=== Richard Sykes (1755–1832) ===
Ward wrote "During elections Rockingham's agents in Hull wrote regularly and fully on the proceedings, the most important being William Hammond, Thomas Scatcherd and the Reverend Richard Sykes." Also

[...]the family of Joseph Sykes of West Ella kept in close touch with municipal affairs. Two of Joseph's sons, the Reverend Richard Sykes and Daniel Sykes who was member for Hull 1820-30 were especially important. According to Richard Sykes, his father could always secure the return of one member, but Joseph Sykes was nevertheless described as 'indolent and avoids as much as possible the Town business'.

With a footnote: "Richard Sykes (1755-1832), son of the above, was educated at Trinity College, Cambridge (B. A., 1777, M. A., 1780), rector of Foxholes, and a J. P. for the East Riding, 1783-1815."

Daniel Sykes's elder brother Richard Sykes graduated B.A. at Trinity College, Cambridge in 1777 and was ordained deacon in 1783. He was a curate at Saxby All Saints and Hull. He became rector of Foxholes and vicar of Kirk Ella.

Richard Sykes married, as her second husband, Mary Rowe, daughter of James Rowe, Mayor of York in 1749; she had married firstly, in 1772, Henry Foord (died 1778), rector of Foxholes. Their only daughter Marianne Jane Sykes married in 1814 Robert Cary Elwes, as his second wife; he had married firstly, in 1797, Caroline, daughter of Charles Anderson-Pelham, 1st Baron Yarborough. Daniel Sykes took on the education of their only son Richard Sykes (c.1784–1870) of West Ella, known for the garden there.
