= William Pound =

English politician

William Pound (died c. 1418), of Kingston upon Hull, Yorkshire, was an English politician. Pound was the son and heir of the MP, Adam Pound.

== Career ==
Pound was Mayor of Kingston upon Hull in the periods 1395–96 and 1397–98.

He was a member (MP) of the parliament of England for Kingston upon Hull in February 1388 and 1399.
