= John Mitchell (Hull politician) =

English politician (c.1781–1859)

John Mitchell (c. 1781 – 29 August 1859) was an English Tory politician.

== Life ==
He was the son of David Mitchell, a Jamaica planter, and nephew of William Mitchell, a plantation owner and attorney there, who was also a Westminster politician. He was educated at Westminster School and Christ Church, Oxford. He entered Lincoln's Inn in 1803, and was called to the bar in 1808.

Mitchell was elected at the 1818 general election as a Member of Parliament (MP) for Kingston-upon-Hull, and held the seat until the 1826 general election, when he did not contest Hull.

Parliament of the United Kingdom
Preceded by Sir George Denys, Bt; John Staniforth	Member of Parliament for Kingston upon Hull; 1818 – 1826; With: James Graham 1818–1820; Daniel Sykes from 1820	Succeeded by John Augustus O'Neill; Daniel Sykes
