= George Schonswar =

MP for Kingston upon Hull
- In office 1830–1832 Serving with William Battie-Wrightson

Personal details
- Born: 15 July 1775
- Died: 19 January 1859 (aged 83)
- Party: Tory (1830); Whig (1831)

George Schonswar (15 July 1775 – 19 January 1859) was a British politician.

== Family ==
Schonswar's grandfather came to England from Friesland in the Netherlands with William III in 1688 and settled in Hull following his military service.

== Positions ==
Schonswar held the following roles in Kingston upon Hull:

- Member of Parliament for Kingston upon Hull (1830, 1831)
- Alderman and sheriff (1808)
- Mayor (1811–12, 1817–18)

== See also ==
- List of MPs elected in the 1830 United Kingdom general election
- List of MPs elected in the 1831 United Kingdom general election
