= John Spaulding =

John Spaulding may refer to:

- John Spaulding (poet), American poet
- John Spaulding (Vermont Treasurer)
- John Spaulding (artist) (1942–2004), American artist

== See also ==
- John Spalding (disambiguation)
