= Thomas Waltham =

English politician

Thomas Waltham (fl. 1379–1388), of Kingston upon Hull, Yorkshire, was an English politician.

== Family ==
Waltham had a wife named Katharine.

== Career ==
Waltham was Mayor of Kingston upon Hull from 1385 to 1386. He was a member (MP) of the parliament of England for Kingston upon Hull in 1379, February 1383 and September 1388.
