= Robert Mell =

British trade unionist and politician

Robert Mell (26 June 1872 – 11 November 1941) was a British trade unionist and politician.

Although Mell's birthdate and place are not known with certainty, Raymond Brown tentatively identified him with a child born in 1872 in Kilpin Pike, to Thomas or Brown Mell and his wife Sarah Willooghby in the East Riding of Yorkshire. He moved to Kingston upon Hull in 1887, where he found work on the railway, joining the Amalgamated Society of Railway Servants (ASRS). In time he became an engine driver, but remained with the ASRS and its successor, the National Union of Railwaymen (NUR).

Mell was an early supporter of the Plebs League, and also of the Labour Party. He was a founding member of the party in Hull, and in 1912 he stood for election to the city council in South Newington. He lost, narrowly, but won the seat the following year, and held it until 1929. At the 1918 United Kingdom general election, he stood in Kingston upon Hull South West, sponsored by the Independent Labour Party. He took 19.3% of the vote and third place.

In 1930/31, Mell was the first Labour Party Mayor of Hull, and he continued on the council as an alderman until 1938, when he was replaced by a new Conservative Party administration. He spent his last years in retirement, dying in 1941 at the age of 69.
