= William Gee =

Peerage person ID=204279

Member of the Parliament of England for Beverley
- In office 1604–1611 Serving with Allan Percy

Member of the Parliament of England for Kingston upon Hull
- In office 1589–1690

Personal details
- Born: 1561
- Died: 3 December 1611 (aged 49–50)
- Education: St John's College, Cambridge

William Gee (1561 – 3 December 1611) was an English politician who served as a Member of Parliament (MP).

== See also ==
- List of MPs elected to the English Parliament in 1689
- List of MPs elected to the English parliament in 1604
