= Adam Tutbury =

Member of the Parliament of England

Adam Tutbury (died ca. 1400), of Kingston-upon-Hull, Yorkshire, was an English politician and merchant.

He was a Member (MP) of the Parliament of England for Kingston upon Hull in 1386.

Tutbury was a trader in fish, wine and cloth and worked for the crown as a collector of customs from 1373 to 1378. Between 1366 and 1390 he acquired numerous properties in Hull, notable among them were those of a merchant in Beverley Street which was the same street as the "Guild Hall" building of Hull's guild of Corpus Christi, of which Tutbury was a member.
