= John Hedon =

English politician

John Hedon (fl. 1378–1386), of Kingston upon Hull, Yorkshire, was an English politician.

He was a Member of the Parliament of England for Kingston upon Hull in 1378 and 1386.
