= John Birken =

English politician

John Birken (fl. 1375–1409) was an English politician. He sat as MP for Kingston upon Hull in 1402.

He also served as bailiff of Kingston upon Hull from Michaelmas 1379 till 1380; and mayor of Kingston upon Hull from 1386 till 1387, and 1400 till 1401.

By March 1408, he was married to Margery.
