= William Bubwith =

14th-century English politician

William Bubwith (fl. 1391), of Kingston upon Hull, Yorkshire, was an English politician.

Bubwith was bailiff of Kingston upon Hull, from 1368 to 1369. He was a collector of taxes for Kingston upon Hull in November 1377, November 1383, and May 1384.

He was a member (MP) of the parliament of England for Kingston upon Hull 1391.
