= John Fitling =

Member of the Parliament of England

John Fitling (died 1434), of Kingston upon Hull, Yorkshire, was an English politician and merchant.

== Career ==
Fitling was a merchant, selling cloth, wine, wool and skins.

He was a Member (MP) of the Parliament of England for Kingston upon Hull in 1406, 1407, 1411, May 1413, 1419, May 1421, 1422, 1423, 1425, 1427 and 1431.
