= Thomas Aldred (MP) =

16th-century English politician

Thomas Aldred (Aldriche, Alured) (by 1515 – 1562), of Kingston upon Hull, Yorkshire, was an English politician.

He was a member (MP) of the parliament of England for Kingston upon Hull in 1558.
