= Edward Baron =

English politician

Edward Baron (by 1464–?1514), of Kingston upon Hull, Yorkshire, was an English politician.

He was MP for Kingston upon Hull in 1512.
