= Tom Kirby =

Tom or Thomas Kirby may refer to:

- Tom Kirby (boxer) (1904–1967), American boxer
- Tom Kirby (darts player) (1947–2008), Irish darts player
- Tom Kirby (politician), American politician
- Thomas Ellis Kirby (1846–1924), auctioneer

== See also ==
- Thomas Kirkby (disambiguation)
