= William Johnson (MP for Kingston-upon-Hull) =

English politician

William Johnson (by 1523 – 1553 or later), of Kingston upon Hull, Yorkshire, was an English politician.

He was a member (MP) of the parliament of England for Kingston upon Hull in March and October 1553.
