= John Lister (died 1616) =

Member of the Parliament of England

John Lister (died 19 January 1616) was an English lead merchant and politician who sat in the House of Commons in 1601

Lister was a lead merchant of Hull and in about 1590 he purchased a plot of land on the High Street overlooking the River Hull. He was a member of Hull Corporation and became an alderman and was mayor of Hull in 1592. Lister was elected Member of Parliament for Kingston upon Hull (Hull) in 1601.

Lister died in 1616 and was buried in Holy Trinity Church in Hull.

Lister married Anne Gayton, daughter of Robert Gayton. Their son John was also MP for Hull.

The house of the Lister family is now a museum known as the Wilberforce House Museum.

Parliament of England
Preceded by Leonard Willan; Anthony Cole	Member of Parliament for Kingston upon Hull; 1601; With: John Graves	Succeeded by Anthony Cole; John Edmonds
