= John Eland (MP) =

16th-century English politician

John Eland (by 1484–1542), of Kingston upon Hull, Yorkshire, was an English politician.

He was a member (MP) of the parliament of England for Kingston upon Hull in 1510.
