= William de la Pole (Chief Baron of the Exchequer) =

British judge and private banker (1300–1366)

1796 drawing of effigies of Sir William de la Pole and his wife Katherine de Norwich, in Holy Trinity Church, Kingston upon Hull

Sir William de la Pole (died 21 June 1366) was a wealthy wool merchant from Kingston upon Hull in Yorkshire, England, who became a royal moneylender and briefly served as Chief Baron of the Exchequer. He founded the de la Pole family, Earls of Lincoln, Earls of Suffolk and Dukes of Suffolk, which by his mercantile and financial prowess he raised from relative obscurity to one of the primary families of the realm in a single generation. At the end of the 14th century he was described in the 'Chronicle of Melsa' as "second to no other merchant of England" (nulli Angligenae mercatori postea secundus fuit). He was the founder of the Charterhouse Monastery, Kingston upon Hull.

William de la Pole, 19th-century statue, Kingston upon Hull

== Origins ==
William de la Pole is generally held to be the second eldest of three brothers; he had an elder brother and associate Richard de la Pole (died 1345) who was also a merchant, and a younger brother, John. His date of birth has been estimated from 1290 to 1295 or possibly earlier. His early life is obscure, the identity of his parents and of their names are not conclusively known. There is much confusion and differing opinion on William's parentage, though a father William, of either Ravenser or Hull, is referred to in a number of sources. Historical research may have been muddled by the presence of more than one William de la Pole in Hull in the first half of the 14th century, but a younger one was the son of William's brother Richard, therefore William's nephew. A.S. Harvey found no documentary evidence for a man named William de la Pole in either Hull or Ravenser prior to Richard and William, and on the two brothers he stated: "Neither their parentage nor place of origin seem to have been revealed by the brothers and these remain unsolved mysteries."

Several Victorian era sources make the statement that his father was called William de la Pole, as do the 17th century historians William Dugdale and William Camden. Frost (1827) notes that the description of the father's status is subject to contradiction by historians; in some sources he is described as a merchant, in others as a knight. A link to a William de la Pole, merchant of Totnes, has also been suggested but lacks evidence.

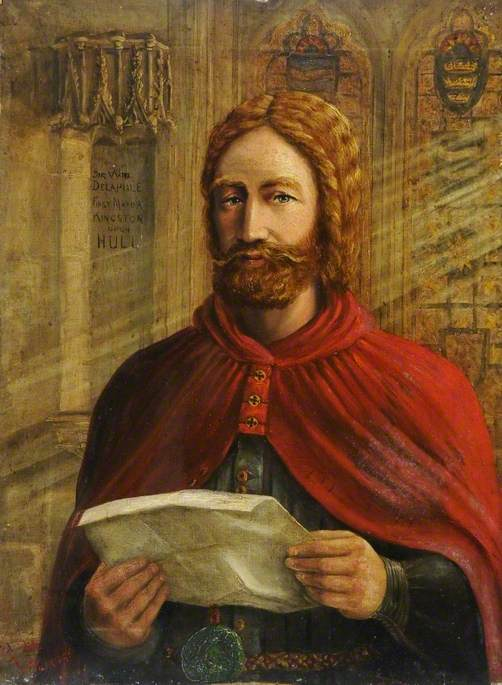
1880 portrait of de la Pole by Thomas Tindall Wildridge

A number of sources identify Elena as the mother of William and Richard, and as wife of William the father; Elena is said to have remarried to a John Rotenheryng, merchant of Hull, after the father's death. Harvey (1957) surmises that the identification of Elena as the mother of William is an error, based on a misinterpretation of the text of the will of John Rotenhering; (Note: Elena wife of John Rotenhering's pre-marriage surname was le Flekere, known in Wyke upon Hull during that period.) Harvey (1957) concludes that the brothers were orphans of an important family, and that John Rotenhering (of Hull) and Robert Rotenhering (of Ravenser), both important merchants, acted as guardians. John Rotenhering appears to have acted as the de la Pole brothers' guardian; much of his property passed to the brothers after his heir Alicia died in 1340 with no descendants.

Fryde states that neither his father's name nor his father's occupation are accurately known.

Frost (1827) proposes that Wiliam's father was Sir William de la Pole of Powysland (d.1305), fourth son of Sir Griffin de la Pole, (Note: This claim contradicts the idea that his father's widow was called Elena, as this William de la Pole's widow was called Gladys (d.1344) and did not remarry.) Harvey (1957) suggests that the brothers' parents may have been Sir Lewis (Llywelyn) de la Pole (d.1294) and his wife Sibilla, and their grandfather Sir Griffin de la Pole of London. Circumstantial evidence for a more knightly and less mercantile background is provided by the brothers' tutelage under important merchants and subsequent rapid rise, which included close links to the crown.

== Career ==
Both William and his brother were originally merchants in Ravenser; by the 1310s he had moved to Kingston upon Hull. (Note: Kingsford gives a written date of at least 1318, and Fryde gives 1317. Fox Bourne states 1316 and supposed the brothers were operating there several years earlier.) Both William and his brother Richard were already notable merchants by the late 1310s; by 1317 they were deputies of the Royal Chief Butler, and from 1321 to 1324 both were chamberlains of the town. In the 1320s William was exporting increasing quantities of wool from Hull. During the same period William had begun providing finance to Edward II relating to his conflict with the French over Gascony; loans of £1,800 and £1,000 are recorded in 1325. The brothers had also become significant figures within the town of Hull; their actions included a sum of £306 spent on improving the fortifications of Hull.

Arms of De la Pole: Azure, a fess between three leopard's faces or

After the downfall of Edward II, the brothers' importance within the state increased as a consequence of the resumption of the wars with Scotland in 1327 during the reign of Edward III under the regency of Roger Mortimer and Queen Isabella; £4,000 was loaned for the Scottish campaign in 1327, in addition to £2,000 loaned for the pay of Dutch mercenaries employed during the ousting of Edward II. By 1329 the total loans exceeded £13,000, amounts comparable to those provided by the traditional royal financiers, the Bardi of Florence. The De la Poles financed the loans through lending from other merchants. In return for these services the De la Poles obtained various privileges and other rewards from the crown. They obtained the manor of Myton in 1330, and in 1332 William became the first mayor of the town of Hull, a position he held until 1335; he also represented Hull in Parliament in several years of the 1330s. William and Richard de la Pole formally dissolved their partnership in 1331.

William was increasingly in the service of the king during the 1330s, both acquiring supplies as well as providing ships for his wars with the Scots, and commissioning and commandeering ships for the dynastic dispute with France that became known as the Hundred Years War. He jointly managed the English Wool Company, set up by the king to finance his war through control of the wool trade. Smuggling of wool caused financial hardship and the collapse of the scheme. From June 1338 to October 1339 the king had to borrow over £100,000 from Pole; he acquired the estate of Burstwick (or lordship of Holderness) from the financially stricken king for £22,650, which brought about the king's resentment. In 1339 he settled a loan of 50,000 florins from the Archbishop of Trier (Treves) in place of the king's crown, which had been used as collateral. The same year De la Pole achieved the rank of Knight Banneret, and on 26 September 1339 he was made Baron of the Exchequer.

In 1340 William and Richard de la Pole, as well as Sir John de Pulteney, were arrested. He was charged in relation to the failure of the English Wool Company, and De la Pole was incarcerated at Devizes Castle and his lands seized; the charge was annulled in 1344. Between 1343 and 1345 he returned to organising the financing of the king's wars through the foundation of a new company. During a period of peace in the 1350s, the king renewed the wool smuggling charges against De la Pole, forcing him to renounce his claim to the manor of Burstwick; in 1354 he signed a document cancelling all the king's debts to him in exchange for his pardon.

1796 drawing of monument of Sir William de la Pole and his wife Katherine de Norwich, in Holy Trinity Church, Kingston upon Hull

In 1350 he founded a hospital in Hull, named the Maison Dieu; shortly before his death he obtained a licence from Edward III for the foundation of a religious house, originally intended to be of the Order of Saint Clare. He died before it was completed, and the place was established by his son Michael de la Pole, 1st Earl of Suffolk as a Carthusian house dedicated to St. Michael (see Charterhouse, Kingston upon Hull). (Note: The building was the predecessor of the place known as The Charterhouse.)

== Death and burial ==
He died on 22 June 1366. In many sources it is stated that he was buried in the Holy Trinity Church, Hull, at the tomb commonly known as the de la Pole tomb. Fryde and others state that his final interment was with his wife Katherine (d.1382) in the church of the Carthusian monastery in Hull, which was not established until 1377.

== Marriage and issue ==
He married Katherine de Norwich, a daughter of Sir Walter de Norwich. She died on 28 January 1382. They had four sons and two daughters: (Note: Gent mentions only three children; Michael, Margaret and Edmund.)

- Michael de la Pole, 1st Earl of Suffolk
- Edmund de la Pole, Captain of Calais in 1387
- Sir Walter de la Pole, Knight
- Sir Thomas de la Pole, Knight (died 1361)
- Blanche de la Pole, who married Richard le Scrope, 1st Baron Scrope of Bolton
- Margaret de la Pole, who married Robert Neville of Hornby

=== Notable descendants ===
The descendants of William de la Pole were notable figures in English history for the next 150 years, including several Dukes of Suffolk, and descendants who took part in the actions of the 'Hundred Years' War' with France. The family's fortunes changed with the loss of the English throne by the House of York in the late 15th century. His direct male descendants included:

- John de la Pole, 1st Earl of Lincoln (c. 1462–16 June 1487), who was named Richard III's heir and died at the Battle of Stoke fighting for Yorkist pretender, Lambert Simnel;
- Edmund de la Pole, 3rd Duke of Suffolk (1471–30 April 1513), who was executed by Henry VIII for claiming the throne as the next Yorkist heir after his elder brother;
- William de la Pole (1478–1539), who was incarcerated in the Tower of London by Henry VII, and his possessions confiscated due to a potential claim to the throne which he never pressed. His imprisonment lasted 37 years until his death in 1539;
- Richard de la Pole (1480–24 February 1525), another Yorkist pretender in succession to John and Edmund. He was killed at the Battle of Pavia.

== Sources ==
- Burton, Thomas (1868) [1396], Bond, Edward A. (ed.), "Chronica Monasterii de Melsa, a Fundatione Usque ad Annum 1396, Auctore Thoma de Burton, Abbate. Accedit Continuatio ad Annum 1406", Rerum Britannicarum medii aevi scriptores (Chronicles and Memorials of Great Britain and Ireland during the Middle Ages) (in Latin and English), vol. 3, Longmans, Green, Reader and Dyer, "Account of Sir William de la Pole", p. 48, "Praescriptus autem dominus Willelmus de la Pole prius mercator fuit, et, apud Ravenserodd mercandizandi scientia instructus, nulli Angligenae mercatori postea secundus fuit. Ipse postea, apud Kyngestonam super Hullo commorans, primus omnium fuit major in eadem villa, monasteriumque Sancti Michaelis juxta dictam Kyngestonam, quod modo est Cartusiensium, inchoavit et fundavit, filiumque habuit suum primogenitum dominum Michaelem de la Pole comitem Suffolchiae, qui dictum monasterium per Carthusienses fecit inhabitari. Ipse quidem Willelmus de la Pole multa millia librarum auri regi Edwardo accommodavit, dum apud Andewerp in Brabantia moraretur. Quapropter rex, in recompensationem dicti auri, praefecit eum baronibus scaccarii sui, totumque dominium de Holderness una cum aliis terris dignitati regiae spectantibus per chartam regiam ei contulit; in qua praecepit ut pro barinetto haberetur."
- Gent, Thomas (1869) [1735], Annales Regioduni Hullini : Or, The History of the Royal and Beautiful Town of Kingston-upon-Hull.., pp. 67–71
- Frost, Charles (1827), Notices relative to the early history of the town and port of Hull, J.B. Nichols
- Burke, John (1831), A general and heraldic dictionary of the peerages of England, Ireland, and Scotland, extinct, dormant, and in abeyance, POLE : Barons De La Pole, .., pp. 435–438
- Fox Bourne, Henry Richard (1866), "II. The De La Poles of Hull (1311–1366)", English merchants: memoirs in illustration of the progress of British commerce, vol. 1, Richard Bentley, pp. 50–70, OL 6565740M; 2nd edition, 1886
- Kingsford, Charles Lethbridge (1896). "Pole, William de la (d.1366)" . Dictionary of National Biography. Vol. 46. pp. 48–50.
- Harvey, A. S. (1957), The De La Pole Family of Kingston upon Hull, East Yorkshire Local History Society
- Horrox, Rosemary (1983), The De la Poles of Hull, East Yorkshire Local History Society
- Fryde, E. B. (2004). "William de la Pole". Oxford Dictionary of National Biography (online ed.). Oxford University Press. doi:10.1093/ref:odnb/22460. (Subscription, Wikipedia Library access or UK public library membership required.)
  - Fryde, E. B. (1962). "The Last Trials of Sir William de la Pole". The Economic History Review. 15: 17–30. doi:10.1111/j.1468-0289.1962.tb02225.x.
  - Fryde, E. B. (1964), "The Wool Accounts of William de la Pole: a Study of Some Aspects of the English wool trade at the start of the Hundred Years' War", St. Anthony's Hall Publications, Borthwick Institute of Historical Research, ISBN 978-0-900701-26-9
  - Fryde, E. B. (1988), William de la Pole: Merchant and King's Banker: Merchant and King's Banker (d. 1366), Hambleton Press, ISBN 0-907628-35-4
