= Thomas Kirkby (MP for Kingston upon Hull) =

Member of the Parliament of England

Thomas Kirkby (fl. 1391–1411), of Kingston upon Hull, Yorkshire, was an English politician and merchant.

== Career ==
Kirkby was a merchant of wool and cloth.

He was a member (MP) of the parliament of England for Kingston upon Hull 1391, 1393, 1394, 1395, January 1397, 1402, 1406 and 1411.
