= John Spalding (14th-century MP) =

Member of the Parliament of England

John Spalding (fl. 1379–1399), of Kingston upon Hull, Yorkshire, was an English politician and cloth merchant.

== Family ==
Nothing is known of Spalding's family. John Spalding of York was also a cloth merchant at this time in the same county, but there is no proof that they were related.

== Career ==
Spalding was the coroner for Kingston upon Hull by February 1389 until after Michaelmas 1392. He held the title Searcher of ships, Kingston-upon-Hull from 14 November 1379 until 8 February 1384. He was Bailiff of Kingston upon Hull in 1385–1386 and 1398–1399. He exported cloth from the port of Hull.

He was a Member (MP) of the Parliament of England for Kingston upon Hull in September 1388.
