= John Bedford (MP for Kingston upon Hull) =

English politician (died 1451)

John Bedford (died 1451) was an English politician. He sat as MP for Kingston upon Hull in 1419, 1420 and May 1421.

== Political career ==
He also served as deputy butler in Grimsby, Kingston upon Hull, Scarborough and Whitby from 12 June 1410 till 28 October 1435 and in Hartlepool from 28 March 1413 till 28 October 1435; collector of customs in Kingston upon Hull from 28 February 1416 till 16 February 1429 and 14 September 1431 till 28 November 1440; bailiff of Kingston upon Hull from Michaelmas 1417 till 1418; mayor of Kingston upon Hull from 1418 till 1420 and 1425 till 1426; alderman of White Friars Ward from 1443 till his death.

He also served as commissioner of array in East Riding of Yorkshire in July 1434; commissioner of inquiry in Yorkshire and Lincolnshire in February 1435 concerning seizure of ships by men of Hull and Grimsby, in Yorkshire in November 1436 and February 1438 concerning evasions; commissioner to arrest ships to transport soldiers to France in Hull in March 1436 and May 1439; and commissioner to raise royal loans in August 1442.

== Family ==
By March 1413, he was married to his first wife, Elizabeth and they had four sons and one daughter. By June 1429, he was married to his second wife, Agnes (died 1459), the daughter of Robert Hebburn and widow of Richard Dalton and John Strother.
