= Walter Jobson =

16th-century English politician

Walter Jobson (by 1519 – alive in December 1605), of London and Kingston upon Hull, Yorkshire, was an English politician.

== Family ==
On 29 August 1540, Jobson married Elizabeth, the widow of William Page of London. Together they had at least one son.

== Career ==
Jobson was Mayor of Kingston upon Hull from 1549 to 1550, and again from 1556 to 1557.

He was a member (MP) of the parliament of England for Kingston upon Hull in 1547, November 1554, 1555, 1558 and 1559.
