= Thomas Kirkby (MP for Totnes) =

English politician

Thomas Kirkby (fl. 1421) was an English politician.

He was a member (MP) of the parliament of England for Totnes in May 1421.
