= Arthur Kendel =

American football coach

Coaching career (HC unless noted)
- 1899–1900: Colorado Normal

Head coaching record
- Overall: 1–4–2

Arthur Kendel was an American college football coach. He served as the head football coach at the State Normal School of Colorado—now known as the University of Northern Colorado—in Greeley, Colorado for two seasons, from 1899 to 1900, compiling a record of 1–4–2.
