= Alexander Stockdale =

16th-century English politician

Alexander Stockdale (c. 1509 – 1563), of Kingston upon Hull, Yorkshire, was an English politician and landowner.

== Family ==
Stockdale was married to Grace née Estofte, and they had a son and a daughter.

== Career ==
Stockdale was Mayor of Kingston upon Hull from 1544 to 1545, 1551 to 1552, and 1558 to 1559.

He was a Member (MP) of the Parliament of England for Kingston upon Hull in March 1553 and April 1554.
