= Thomas Dalton (merchant) =

Member of the Parliament of England

Thomas Dalton (1516/17 – 4 January 1591), of Kingston upon Hull, Yorkshire, was an English merchant and landowner who held a number of public offices in Kingston upon Hull.

He was a younger son of the merchant Thomas Dalton of Kingston-upon-Hull, who had been Mayor of Hull in 1547. Becoming a successful merchant, he invested heavily in land, buying manors both in his own right and jointly with others.

Dalton was appointed as Sheriff of Hull for 1550–51 and was Mayor for 1554–55, 1560–61, and 1569–70. In 1555 and 1572 he was elected as one of the two Members of the Parliament of England for the borough of Kingston upon Hull, a short commitment in the 16th century.

Dalton married twice; firstly Anne Walker, a widow, and secondly Anne, a daughter of Sir Robert Tyrwhitt, of Kettleby in Lincolnshire, with whom he had six sons and three daughters. On his death, he was buried at Holy Trinity church, Hull.
