= John Aldwick =

English politician

John Aldwick (died 22 November 1444) was an English politician. He sat as MP for Kingston upon Hull in November 1414 and 1426 and mayor of Kingston upon Hull from 1438 till 1440.

He also served as bailiff of Kingston upon Hull from Michaelmas 1415 till 1416 and alderman of St. Mary's ward from 1443 till his death.

He was the son of Thomas Aldwick of Kingston upon Hull by his wife Margaret. He married and had one son.
