= John Ramsden (died 1665) =

John Ramsden (c1612 - 1665) was an English politician who sat in the House of Commons in 1659 and 1660.

Ramsden was the son of John Ramsden, merchant of Hull, and his wife Margaret Barnard, daughter of William Barnard, also a merchant of Hull. His father was an important cloth exporter who died of the plague while he was mayor for the second time. In 1640, Ramsden became alderman of Hull and chamberlain. He was sheriff of Hull for 1644–45 and Mayor of Hull for 1648–49. In 1648, he was commissioner for militia and in 1649, commissioner for assessment for Hull. He was removed from his offices in 1650 because he refused to take the oath to the Commonwealth. In 1659 he was commissioner for sewers in the East Riding.

In 1659, Ramsden was elected Member of Parliament for Kingston upon Hull for the Third Protectorate Parliament. He was re-elected MP for Hull in April 1660 for the Convention Parliament. He became commissioner for assessment for Hull and the East Riding of Yorkshire in August 1660 and commissioner for sewers for the East Riding in September 1660. He finished bottom of the poll at the 1661 general election, and refused to be reinstated as alderman.

Ramsden probably died in 1665 as his name was not on the commission of the peace in 1666.

Ramsden married Joyce Wynn, daughter of Edmund Wynn, draper of London and Thornton Curtis, Lincolnshire. He had two sons and a daughter.

Parliament of England
Preceded by William Lister	Member of Parliament for Kingston upon Hull; 1659; With: Andrew Marvell	Succeeded by Sir Henry Vane
