= Simon Grimsby (MP for Kingston upon Hull) =

English politician

Simon Grimsby (fl. 1381–1394), of Kingston upon Hull, Yorkshire, was an English politician. He was controller of royal customs at Kingston-upon-Hull until 1416, when he either died or retired, as he is no longer found in any records after that year.

He was a member (MP) of the parliament of England for Kingston upon Hull in 1381, 1385, February 1388 and 1394.
