= Kingston upon Hull (constituency) =

Parliamentary constituency in the United Kingdom, 1801–1885

- Former borough constituency for the House of Commons
- County: Yorkshire
- Major settlements: Kingston upon Hull

1305–1885
- Seats: Two
- Replaced by: Hull Central, Hull East and Hull West

Kingston upon Hull, often simply referred to as Hull, was a parliamentary constituency in Yorkshire, electing two members of parliament to the Parliaments of England, Great Britain and House of Commons of the Parliament of the United Kingdom, from 1305 until 1885. Its MPs included the anti-slavery campaigner, William Wilberforce, and the poet Andrew Marvell.

== History ==
Kingston upon Hull was a borough constituency in the town (later city) of Hull. Until the Great Reform Act 1832, it consisted only of the parish of St Mary's, Hull and part of Holy Trinity, Hull, entirely to the west of the River Hull. This excluded parts of the urban area which had not been originally part of the town, but some of these – the rest of Holy Trinity parish, Sculcoates, Drypool, Garrisonside and part of Sutton-on-Hull – were brought into the constituency by boundary changes in 1832. This increased the population of the borough from around 16,000 to almost 50,000.

The borough sent its first two known Members to the parliament of 1305 and thereafter with fair regularity from 1334. Until the Reform Act 1832, the right to vote in Hull was vested in the freemen of the city, which made the constituency one of the larger and more competitive ones. At the general election of 1831, 2,174 voters went to the polls.

The Hull constituency was abolished for the 1885 general election, the city being divided into three single-member constituencies, Kingston upon Hull Central, Kingston upon Hull East and Kingston upon Hull West.

== Members of Parliament ==
=== MPs 1305–1640 ===
Parliament	First member	Second member
1332 (Mar)	William de la Pole	
1332 (Sep)	?	
1332/3	?	
1334 (Feb)	?	
1334 (Sep)	?	
1335	William de la Pole	
1336	William de la Pole	
1337	?	
1338	William de la Pole	
1386	Adam Tutbury	John Hedon
1388 (Feb)	Simon Grimsby	William Pound
1388 (Sep)	Thomas Waltham	John Spalding
1390 (Jan)		
1390 (Nov)		
1391	William Bubwith	Thomas Kirkby
1393	Thomas Fountenay	Thomas Kirkby
1394	Simon Grimsby	Thomas Kirkby
1395	Robert Snainton	Thomas Kirkby
1397 (Jan)	William Terry	Thomas Kirkby
1397 (Sep)		
1399	William Terry	William Pound
1401		
1402	John Birken	Thomas Kirkby
1404 (Jan)		
1404 (Oct)		
1406	John Fitling	Thomas Kirkby
1407	John Fitling	John Leversegge
1410		
1411	John Fitling	Thomas Kirkby
1413 (Feb)		
1413 (May)	John Fitling	Hugh Clitheroe
1414 (Apr)		
1414 (Nov)	John Aldwick	Walter Grimsby
1415	Robert Hornsea	Richard Swan
1416 (Mar)	John Saunderson	Walter Grimsby
1416 (Oct)		
1417		
1419	John Bedford	John Fitling
1420	John Bedford	Robert Kirkton
1421 (May)	John Bedford	John Fitling
1421 (Dec)	Thomas Marshall	Robert Holme
1426	John Aldwick	
1495	Robert Chapman	
1510	Roger Bushell	John Eland
1512	Edward Baron	Thomas Wilkinson
1515	Thomas Wilkinson	Robert Harrison
1523	?	
1529	George Matheson	Edward Madison
1536	Sir Edward Madison	George Matheson
1539	George Matheson	Robert Kemsey
1542	?	
1545	Edward Rogers	Robert Googe or Goche
1547	John Thacker	Walter Jobson
1553 (Mar)	Alexander Stockdale	William Johnson
1553 (Oct)	John Thacker	William Johnson
1554 (Apr)	Alexander Stockdale	John Thacker
1554 (Nov)	Walter Jobson	John Thornton
1555	Walter Jobson	Thomas Dalton
1558	Walter Jobson	Thomas Aldred
1558/9	Walter Jobson	John Oversall
1562/3	Christopher Estofte, died and replaced in 1566 by Henry Fanshawe	John Thornton
1571	John Thornton	James Clerkson
1572	Thomas Dalton	James Clerkson
1581	Dalton and Clerkson dismissed as idle and impotent and replaced in January 1581 by Thomas Fleming and John Fawether or Fairweather	
1584	John Thornton	John Aldred
1586	Edward Wakefield	John Aldred
1588	Leonard Willan	William Gee
1593	Leonard Willan	Peter Proby
1597	Leonard Willan	Anthony Cole
1601	John Lister	John Graves
1604–1611	Anthony Cole	John Edmonds
1614	Sir John Bourchier	Richard Burgis
1621	John Lister	Maurice Abbot
1624	John Lister	Sir John Suckling, sat for Middlesex and was replaced by Maurice Abbot
1625	John Lister	Maurice Abbot
1626	John Lister	Lancelot Roper
1628	John Lister	James Watkinson
1629–1640	No Parliaments convened	

=== MPs 1640–1885 ===
Year	First member	First party	Second member	Second party
April 1640	Sir Henry Vane, junior	Parliamentarian	Sir John Lister	Parliamentarian
November 1640	Sir Henry Vane, junior	Parliamentarian	Sir John Lister (died December 1640)	Parliamentarian
1641	Sir Henry Vane, junior	Parliamentarian	Peregrine Pelham	Parliamentarian
1650	Sir Henry Vane, junior	Parliamentarian	Pelham died 1650, seat vacant thereafter	
1653	Hull was unrepresented in Barebone's Parliament			
1654	William Lister		Hull had only one seat in the First and Second Parliaments of the Protectorate	
1656	William Lister		Hull had only one seat in the First and Second Parliaments of the Protectorate	
January 1659	John Ramsden		Andrew Marvell	
May 1659	Sir Henry Vane, junior		One seat vacant	
April 1660	John Ramsden		Andrew Marvell	
1661	Anthony Gilby		Andrew Marvell	
1678	Anthony Gilby		William Ramsden	
February 1679	Lemuel Kingdon		William Ramsden	
September 1679	Sir Michael Warton		William Gee	
1685	John Ramsden		Sir Willoughby Hickman	
1689	John Ramsden		William Gee	
1690	John Ramsden		Charles Osborne	
1695	Sir William St Quintin	Tory	Charles Osborne	
1701	Sir William St Quintin	Tory	William Maister	Tory
1717	Sir William St Quintin	Tory	Nathaniel Rogers	
1724	George Crowle		Nathaniel Rogers	
1727	George Crowle		Joseph Micklethwaite	
February 1734 by-election	George Crowle		Henry Maister	
1741	George Crowle		William Carter	
1744 by-election	George Crowle		Harry Pulteney	
1747	Lord Robert Manners	Tory	Thomas Carter	
1754 by-election	Lord Robert Manners	Tory	Richard Crowle	
1757 by-election	Lord Robert Manners	Tory	Sir George Metham	
1766 by-election	Lord Robert Manners	Tory	William Weddell	
1774	Lord Robert Manners	Tory	David Hartley	Rockingham Whig
1780	Lord Robert Manners	Tory	William Wilberforce (Note: Wilberforce was re-elected at the general election of 1784, but was also elected for Yorkshire, which he chose to represent, and did not sit for Hull in this parliament)	Tory
1782 by-election	David Hartley	Rockingham Whig	William Wilberforce	Tory
March 1784	Samuel Thornton	Tory	William Wilberforce	Tory
June 1784 by-election	Samuel Thornton	Tory	Walter Spencer-Stanhope	Tory
1790	Samuel Thornton	Tory	Aubrey Beauclerk	
1796	Samuel Thornton	Tory	Sir Charles Turner	
1802	Samuel Thornton	Tory	John Staniforth	Tory
1806	William Joseph Denison	Whig	John Staniforth	Tory
1807	Philip Stanhope	Whig	John Staniforth	Tory
1812	George Denys (Note: George William Denys was created a baronet as Sir George Denys in 1813)	Tory	John Staniforth	Tory
1818	John Mitchell	Tory	James Graham	Whig
1820	John Mitchell	Tory	Daniel Sykes	Whig
1826	John O'Neill	Tory	Daniel Sykes	Whig
1830	George Schonswar	Tory	William Battie-Wrightson	Whig
1831	George Schonswar	Whig	William Battie-Wrightson	Whig
1832	Matthew Davenport Hill	Whig	William Hutt	Radical
January 1835	David Carruthers	Conservative	William Hutt	Radical
June 1835 by-election	Thomas Perronet Thompson	Radical	William Hutt	Radical
1837	Sir Walter James	Conservative	William Wilberforce (Note: A petition was lodged after the 1837 election, and Wilberforce's qualification as a candidate was declared defective and his election voided. After scrutiny of the votes, Hutt (who had originally been placed third) was declared elected in his stead 7 May 1838)	Conservative
1838	Sir Walter James	Conservative	William Hutt	Radical
1841	Sir Walter James	Conservative	Sir John Hanmer	Conservative
1847	Matthew Talbot Baines	Whig	James Clay	Radical
1852 (Note: The 1852 election was declared void on petition. Hull's right to representation was suspended and a Royal Commission appointed to investigate. Once it had reported, a new election was held, which none of the four original candidates contested.)	George Robinson	Whig	James Clay	Radical
1853	Writ suspended			
1854 by-election	William Digby Seymour	Radical	William Henry Watson	Whig
February 1857 by-election	William Digby Seymour	Radical	James Clay	Radical
March 1857	Anthony Ashley-Cooper	Peelite	James Clay	Radical
April 1859	Joseph Hoare (Note: After the 1859 election, the election of Hoare was declared void on petition, and a by-election held in August 1859)	Conservative	James Clay	Liberal
August 1859 by-election	Joseph Somes	Conservative	James Clay	Liberal
1865	Charles Morgan Norwood	Liberal	James Clay	Liberal
1873 by-election	Charles Morgan Norwood	Liberal	Joseph Walker Pease	Conservative
1874	Charles Morgan Norwood	Liberal	Charles Wilson	Liberal
1885	constituency divided: see Kingston upon Hull Central, Kingston upon Hull East and Kingston upon Hull West			

== Election results ==
=== Elections in the 1830s ===
General election 1830: Kingston upon Hull
Party	Candidate	Votes	%	±%
Tory	George Schonswar	1,564	42.9	
Whig	William Battie-Wrightson	1,213	33.3	
Whig	Thomas Gisborne Burke	869	23.8	
Majority		351	9.6	
Turnout		2,174	c. 79.1	
Registered electors		c. 2,750		
Tory hold		Swing		
Whig hold		Swing		

General election 1831: Kingston upon Hull
Party	Candidate	Votes	%
Whig	William Battie-Wrightson	Unopposed	
Whig	George Schonswar	Unopposed	
Registered electors		c. 2,750	
Whig hold			
Whig gain from Tory			

General election 1832: Kingston upon Hull
Party	Candidate	Votes	%
Whig	Matthew Davenport Hill	1,674	32.5
Radical	William Hutt	1,610	31.3
Tory	David Carruthers (MP)	1,429	27.8
Radical	James Acland	433	8.4
Turnout		3,305	85.6
Registered electors		3,863	
Majority		64	1.2
Whig hold			
Majority		181	3.5
Radical gain from Whig			

General election 1835: Kingston upon Hull
Party	Candidate	Votes	%	±%
Conservative	David Carruthers (MP)	1,836	38.7	+10.9
Radical	William Hutt	1,536	32.4	−7.3
Whig	Matthew Davenport Hill	1,371	28.9	−3.6
Turnout		3,108	73.2	−12.4
Registered electors		4,244		
Majority		465	9.8	N/A
Conservative gain from Whig		Swing	+6.4	
Majority		165	3.5	±0.0
Radical hold		Swing	−6.4	

Carruthers' death caused a by-election.

By-election, 20 June 1835: Kingston upon Hull
Party	Candidate	Votes	%	±%
Radical	Thomas Perronet Thompson	1,428	50.1	+17.7
Conservative	Henry St John-Mildmay	1,423	49.9	+11.2
Majority		5	0.2	N/A
Turnout		2,851	67.2	−6.0
Registered electors		4,244		
Radical gain from Conservative		Swing	+3.3	

General election 1837: Kingston upon Hull
Party	Candidate	Votes	%	±%
Conservative	William Wilberforce	1,514	25.5	+6.2
Conservative	Walter James	1,505	25.3	+6.0
Radical	William Hutt	1,497	25.2	−7.2
Whig	Benjamin Wood	1,430	24.0	−4.9
Majority		8	0.1	−9.7
Turnout		2,990	70.8	−2.4
Registered electors		4,222		
Conservative hold		Swing	+4.9	
Conservative gain from Radical		Swing	+4.8	

- On petition, Wilberforce's election was declared void and Hutt was declared elected in 1838.

=== Elections in the 1840s ===
General election 1841: Kingston upon Hull
Party	Candidate	Votes	%	±%
Conservative	John Hanmer	1,843	26.0	+0.5
Conservative	Walter James	1,830	25.9	+0.6
Radical	James Clay	1,761	24.9	+12.3
Radical	Thomas Perronet Thompson	1,645	23.2	+10.6
Majority		69	1.0	+0.9
Turnout		3,583	73.7	+2.9
Registered electors		4,862		
Conservative hold		Swing	−5.5	
Conservative hold		Swing	−5.4	

General election 1847: Kingston upon Hull
Party	Candidate	Votes	%	±%
Whig	Matthew Talbot Baines	2,168	36.1	N/A
Radical	James Clay	2,135	35.5	−12.6
Whig	James Brown	1,705	28.4	N/A
Turnout		3,004 (est)	65.0 (est)	−8.7
Registered electors		4,618		
Majority		33	0.6	N/A
Whig gain from Conservative		Swing	N/A	
Majority		430	7.1	N/A
Radical gain from Conservative		Swing	N/A	

Baines was appointed President of the Poor Law Board, requiring a by-election.

By-election, 7 February 1849: Kingston upon Hull
Party	Candidate	Votes	%	±%
Whig	Matthew Talbot Baines	Unopposed		
Whig hold				

=== Elections in the 1850s ===
General election 1852: Kingston upon Hull
Party	Candidate	Votes	%	±%
Radical	James Clay	2,246	28.3	−7.2
Whig	George Robinson	2,242	28.3	−36.2
Conservative	John Bramley-Moore	1,815	22.9	New
Conservative	Charles Lennox Butler	1,626	20.5	New
Turnout		3,965 (est)	75.9 (est)	+10.9
Registered electors		5,221		
Majority		4	0.0	−7.1
Radical hold		Swing	+5.5	
Majority		427	5.4	+4.8
Whig hold		Swing	−5.5	

After an election petition committee found evidence of bribery and treating, both members were unseated and the writ was suspended in March 1853. A by-election was then held in August 1854.

By-election, 18 August 1854: Kingston upon Hull
Party	Candidate	Votes	%	±%
Radical	William Digby Seymour	1,820	34.8	+6.5
Whig	William Henry Watson	1,806	34.6	+6.3
Conservative	Samuel Auchmuty Dickson	1,600	30.6	−12.8
Turnout		3,413 (est)	74.7 (est)	−1.2
Registered electors		4,572		
Majority		14	0.2	+0.2
Radical hold		Swing	+6.5	
Majority		206	4.0	−1.4
Whig hold		Swing	+6.4	

Watson resigned after being appointed a Baron of the Exchequer, causing a by-election.

By-election, 11 February 1857: Kingston upon Hull
Party	Candidate	Votes	%	±%
Radical	James Clay	Unopposed		
Radical gain from Whig				

General election 1857: Kingston upon Hull
Party	Candidate	Votes	%	±%
Radical	James Clay	2,365	36.4	+6.1
Peelite	Anthony Ashley-Cooper	2,303	35.5	N/A
Radical	William Compton	1,392	21.4	N/A
Radical	William Digby Seymour	434	6.7	N/A
Turnout		3,247 (est)	59.1 (est)	−16.8
Registered electors		5,494		
Majority		62	0.9	+0.9
Radical hold		Swing	N/A	
Majority		911	14.1	N/A
Peelite gain from Whig		Swing	N/A	

General election 1859: Kingston upon Hull
Party	Candidate	Votes	%	±%
Liberal	James Clay	2,445	36.6	+0.2
Conservative	Joseph Hoare	2,269	34.0	−1.5
Liberal	Harvey Lewis	1,959	29.4	N/A
Turnout		3,337 (est)	60.4 (est)	+1.3
Registered electors		5,526		
Majority		176	2.6	+1.7
Liberal hold		Swing	+0.5	
Majority		310	4.6	N/A
Conservative gain from Peelite		Swing	−0.5	

Hoare was unseated after an election petition committee found evidence of corruption, causing a by-election.

By-election, 20 August 1859: Kingston upon Hull
Party	Candidate	Votes	%	±%
Conservative	Joseph Somes	2,068	56.7	+22.7
Liberal	Harvey Lewis	1,579	43.3	−22.7
Majority		489	13.4	+8.8
Turnout		3,647	66.0	+5.6
Registered electors		5,526		
Conservative hold		Swing	+22.7	

=== Elections in the 1860s ===
General election 1865: Kingston upon Hull
Party	Candidate	Votes	%	±%
Liberal	James Clay	2,583	30.7	−5.9
Liberal	Charles Morgan Norwood	2,547	30.3	+0.9
Conservative	John Somes	1,910	22.8	+5.8
Conservative	Joseph Hoare	1,374	16.3	−0.7
Majority		637	7.5	+4.9
Turnout		4,207 (est)	75.6 (est)	+15.2
Registered electors		5,566		
Liberal hold		Swing	−4.2	
Liberal gain from Conservative		Swing	−0.8	

General election 1868: Kingston upon Hull
Party	Candidate	Votes	%	±%
Liberal	Charles Morgan Norwood	7,282	28.0	−2.3
Liberal	James Clay	6,874	26.5	−4.2
Conservative	Henry Atkinson	6,383	24.6	+1.8
Conservative	Robert Baxter	5,444	21.0	+4.7
Majority		491	1.9	−5.6
Turnout		12,992 (est)	75.8 (est)	+0.2
Registered electors		17,146		
Liberal hold		Swing	−2.1	
Liberal hold		Swing	−4.5	

=== Elections in the 1870s ===
Clay's death caused a by-election.

By-election, 24 Oct 1873: Kingston upon Hull
Party	Candidate	Votes	%	±%
Conservative	Joseph Walker Pease	6,873	51.0	+5.4
Liberal	Edward Reed	6,594	49.0	−5.5
Majority		279	2.0	N/A
Turnout		13,467	64.3	−11.5
Registered electors		20,947		
Conservative gain from Liberal		Swing	+5.5	

General election 1874: Kingston upon Hull
Party	Candidate	Votes	%	±%
Liberal	Charles Wilson	8,886	35.3	+8.8
Liberal	Charles Morgan Norwood	8,549	34.0	+6.0
Conservative	Joseph Walker Pease	7,706	30.7	−14.9
Majority		843	3.3	+1.4
Turnout		16,424 (est)	74.6 (est)	−1.2
Registered electors		22,026		
Liberal hold		Swing	+8.1	
Liberal hold		Swing	+6.7	

=== Elections in the 1880s ===
General election 1880: Kingston upon Hull
Party	Candidate	Votes	%	±%
Liberal	Charles Morgan Norwood	12,071	32.9	−1.1
Liberal	Charles Wilson	11,837	32.2	−3.1
Conservative	John Buckingham Pope	6,767	18.4	+3.0
Conservative	Henry Atkinson	6,067	16.5	+1.2
Majority		5,070	13.8	+10.5
Turnout		18,371 (est)	70.1 (est)	−4.5
Registered electors		26,193		
Liberal hold		Swing	−2.1	
Liberal hold		Swing	−2.2	
