= John Lister (American football) =

American football coach

Coaching career (HC unless noted)
- 1893–1896: Colorado Normal

Head coaching record
- Overall: 0–4

John Lister was an American college football coach. He served as the head football coach at the State Normal School of Colorado—now known as the University of Northern Colorado—in Greeley, Colorado from 1893 to 1896, compiling a record of 0–4.
