= Privileged bodies of the United Kingdom =

Institutions with the right to address the British Sovereign

The privileged bodies of the United Kingdom are those institutions and corporations which enjoy the historic right to present an address to the British Sovereign in person.

In modern times this right is exercised on significant occasions in the life of the monarch and at a ceremony specially organised for the purpose. A senior representative of each body delivers each loyal address and, after each has been read, the monarch responds and receives parchment copies of each.

== List ==
On 9 March 2023, the following 27 bodies presented loyal addresses to King Charles III at a ceremony at Buckingham Palace to mark the start of his reign:

Type	Privileged bodies
Faith communities and ecclesiastical bodies	The General Synod of the Church of England; The General Assembly of the Church of Scotland; The Free Churches Group; The Religious Society of Friends (Quakers); The Board of Deputies of the British Jews and the Anglo-Jewish Association; The Dean and Chapter of Westminster; The Dean and Chapter of St Paul’s Cathedral; The Dean and Canons of St George’s Chapel, Windsor; The Catholic Church in England and Wales
Institutions of higher learning	The University of Oxford; The University of Cambridge; The University of Edinburgh; The University of London; The University of St Andrews; The University of Glasgow; The University of Aberdeen
Bodies from cities and regions	The City of London Corporation; The Corporation of the City of Edinburgh; The Greater London Authority; The Lieutenancy of the City of London; The Corporation of the City of Westminster; The Royal County of Berkshire; The Royal Borough of Windsor and Maidenhead
Cultural, learned and civic organisations	The Royal Society; The Royal Academy of Arts; The Bank of England; The Military Knights of Windsor

== History ==
The speeches given and presented were originally called humble addresses, like those of Parliament, but over time have become known as loyal addresses. They offered regional government and other organisations an opportunity to demonstrate their dedication to the Crown. There were formerly several hundred privileged bodies and the addresses provided the opportunity to reassert their loyalty as well as drawing the monarch's attention to particular issues. In an age of limited communications, it was a rare and valuable opportunity to directly address the monarch. It also gave the government of the time an idea of what concerned the country’s citizens.

Today, as with Parliament's humble addresses, the privilege is more ceremonial than political, serving to emphasise and reaffirm the antiquity and importance of the privileged bodies on special royal occasions.

Queen Elizabeth II received the privileged bodies five times during her reign:

- her accession in 1952
- her Silver Jubilee in 1977
- the engagement of The Prince of Wales in 1981
- her Golden Jubilee in 2002
- her Diamond Jubilee in 2012

King Charles III has currently received them once during his reign:

- to mark the start of his reign and before his coronation in 2023
