= High Street, Hull =

Street in Hull, East Riding of Yorkshire, England

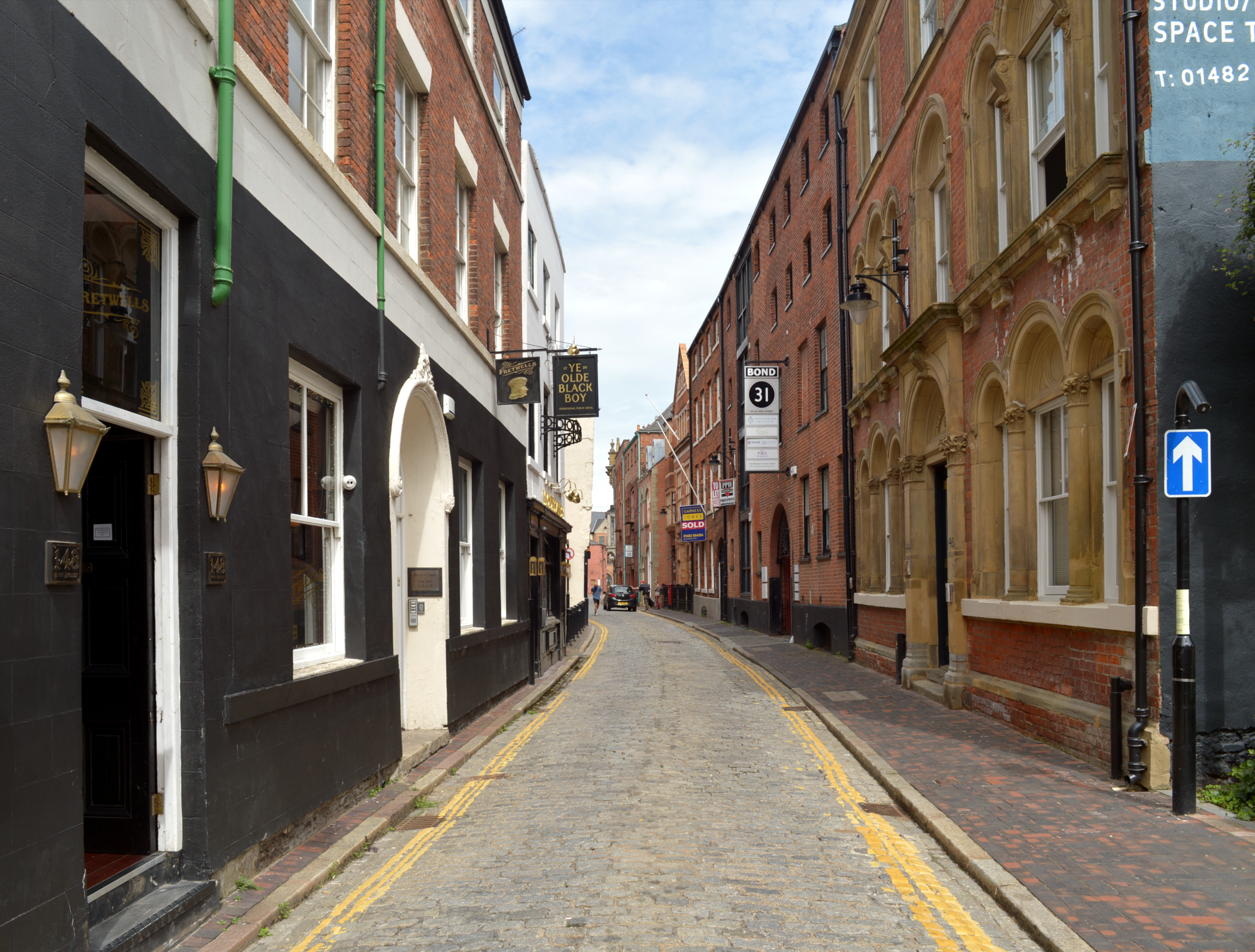
View of the street, 2020

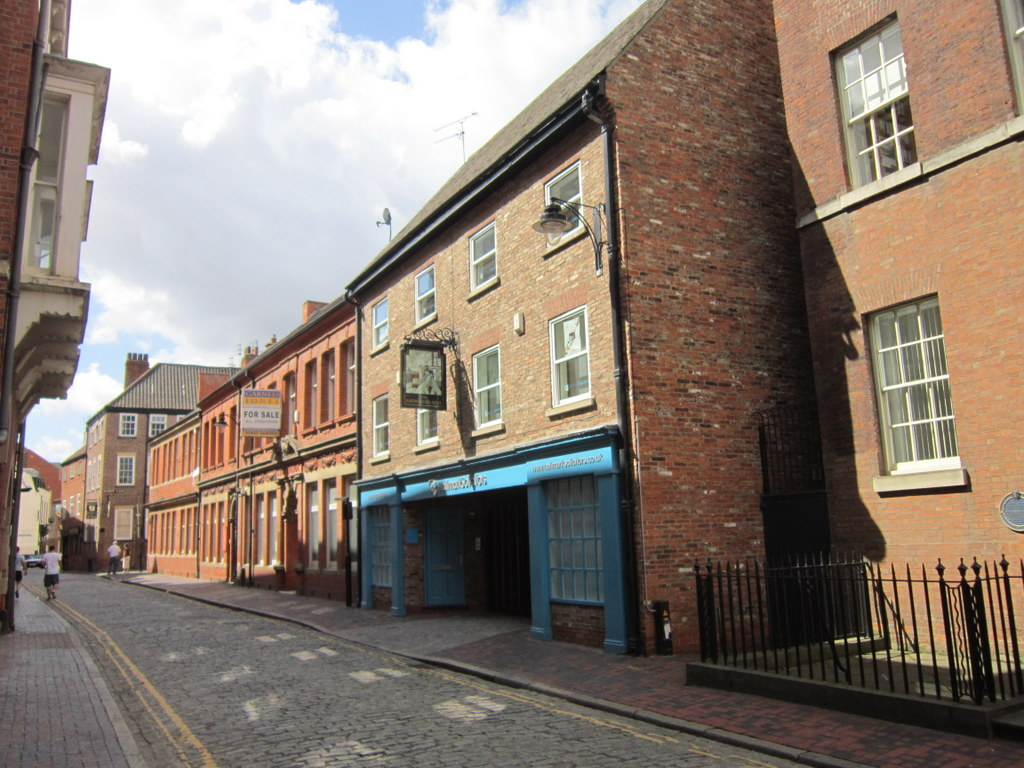
The Sailmakers Arms

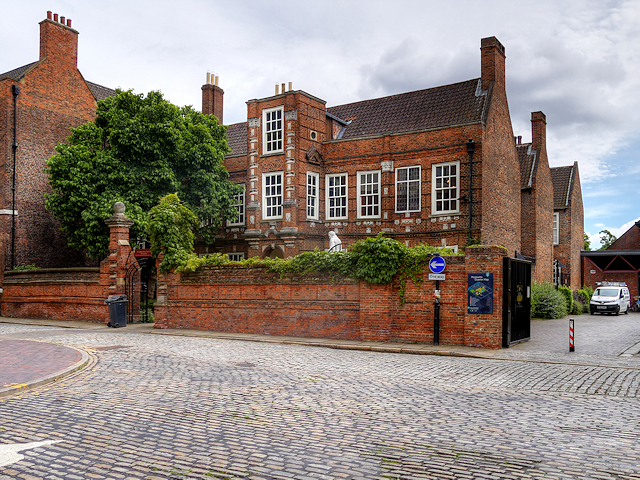
Wilberforce House seen from the High Street

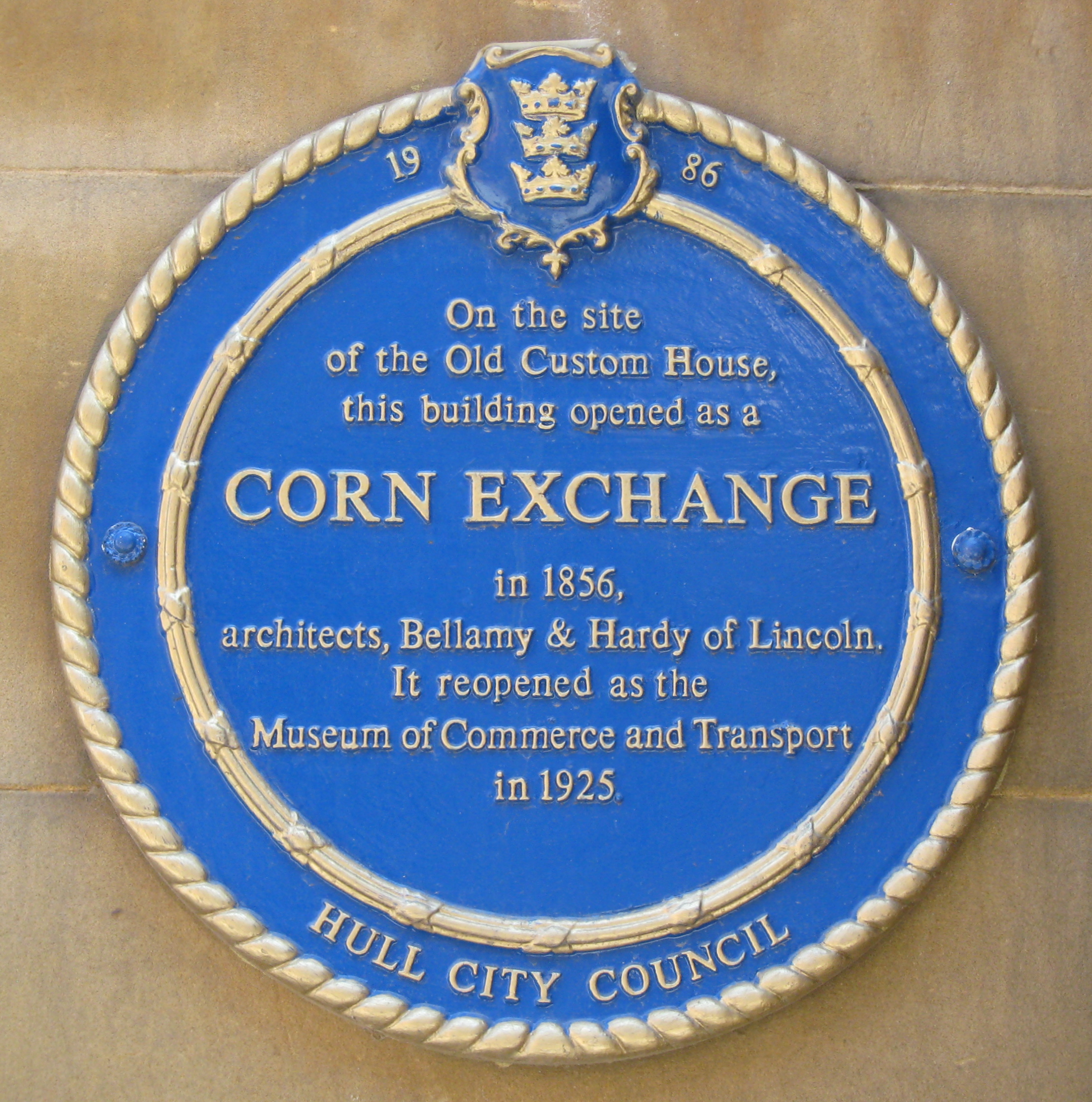
Blue plaque on the former custom house and corn exchange

High Street is a road in the city centre of Kingston upon Hull in East Riding of Yorkshire, England. Located in the city's old town close to the River Hull, it features a number of historic buildings. Historically a high street it was once the commercial heart of the port settlement of Hull – which later shifted westwards to centre around Whitefriargate.

It now forms the city's Museums Quarter. Among these is Wilberforce House, the birthplace of the politician and abolitionist William Wilberforce which commemorates his long fight against the slave trade and the practice of slavery. At the time of his birth it was filled with wealthy merchant's houses, many of them traders with the Baltic. A number of buildings are now listed.

== Bibliography ==
- Hague, William (2012). William Wilberforce: The Life of the Great Anti-Slave Trade Campaigner. UK: HarperCollins.
- Neave, David; Pevsner, Nikolaus (1995). Yorkshire: York and the East Riding. Yale University Press.
