= Wilberforce House =

Historic house museum in Kingston upon Hull, England

Coordinates: 53.744461°N 0.330073°W

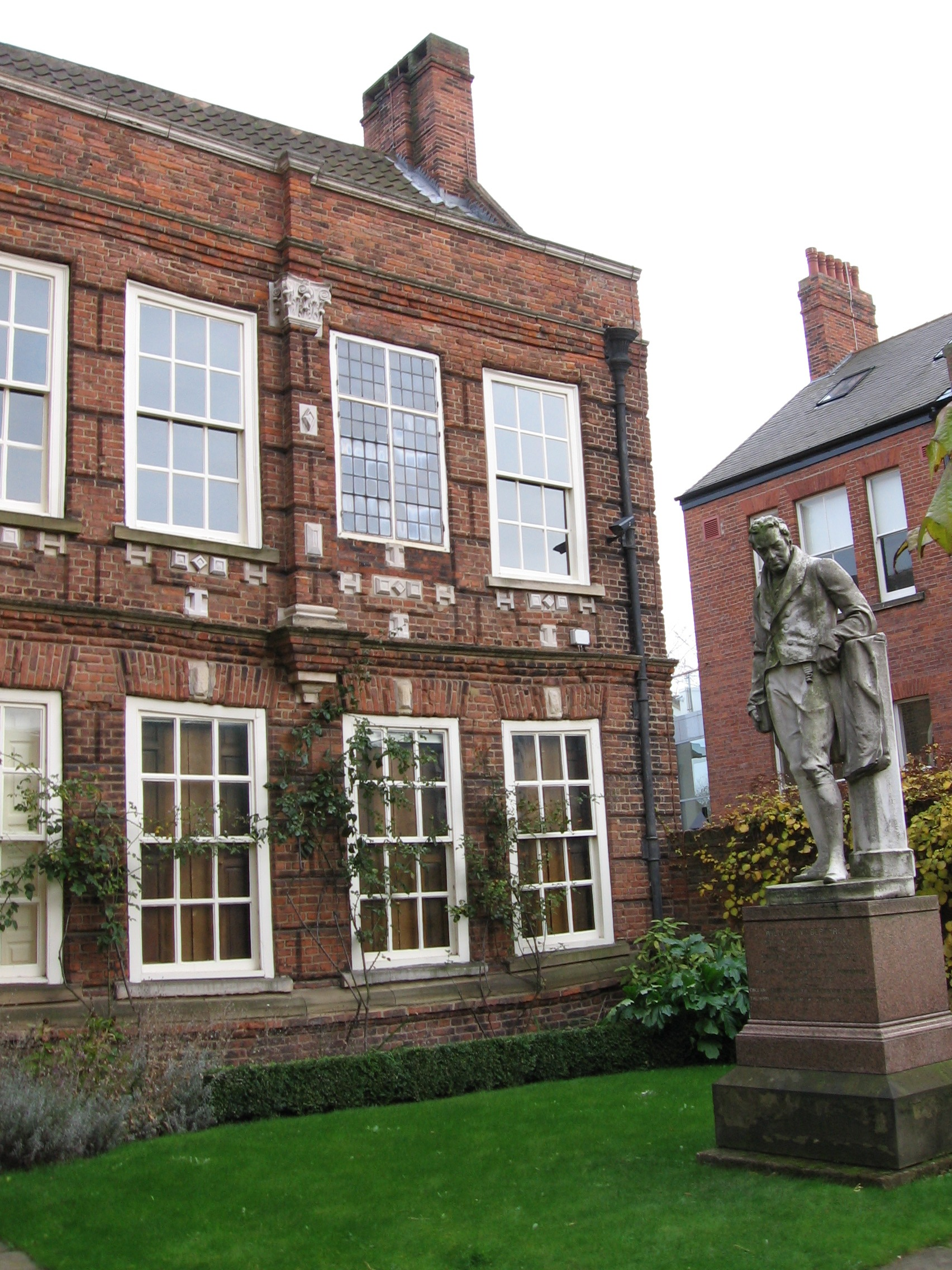
Wilberforce House, High Street, Hull

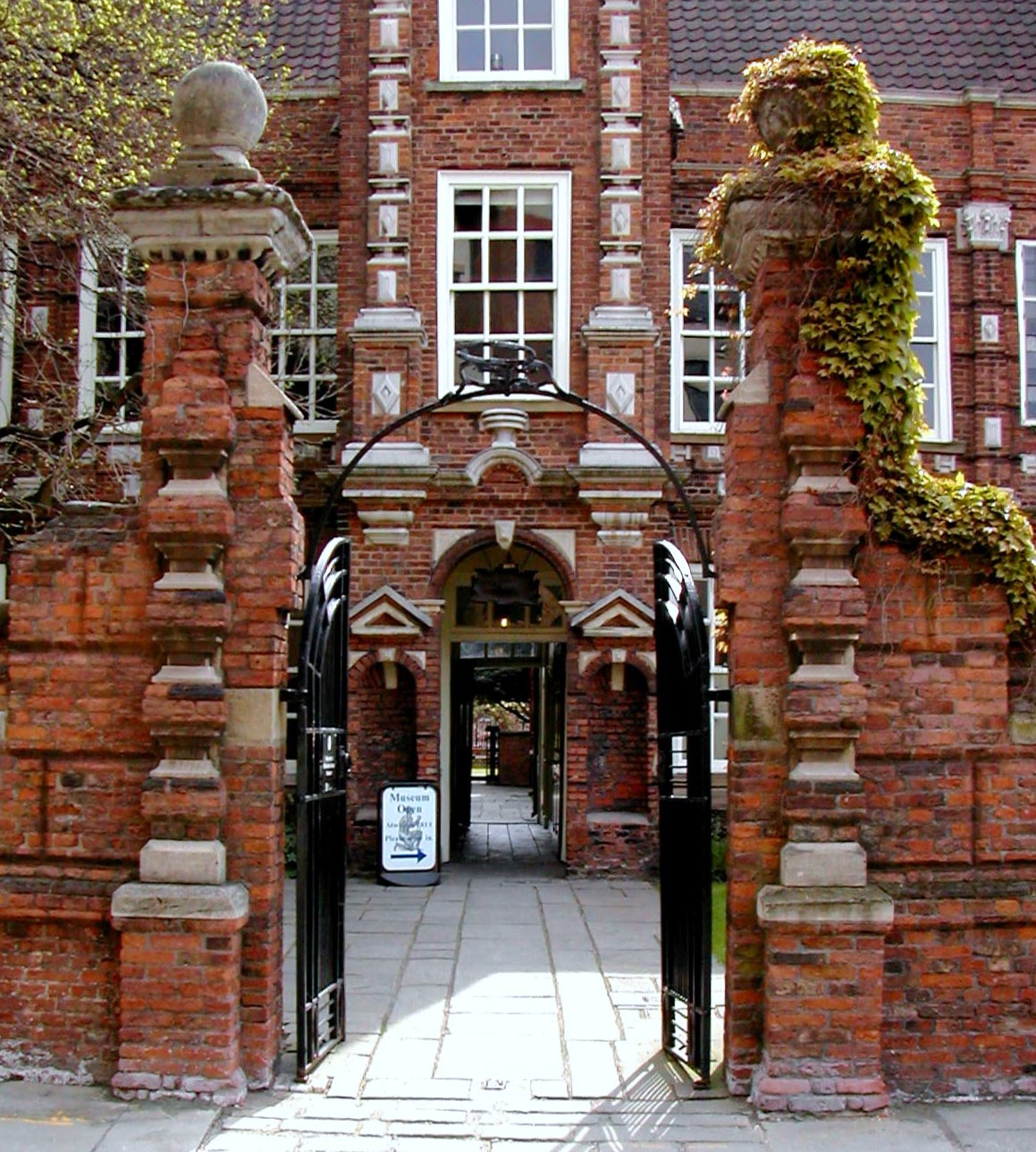
The front entrance

Wilberforce House is a British historic house museum, part of the Museums Quarter of Kingston upon Hull. It is the birthplace of social reformer William Wilberforce (1759–1833), who used his time as a member of Parliament to work for the abolition of slavery throughout the British Empire, which had not been thoroughly stymied by the Abolition of Slave Trade Act 1807. Like the nearby Blaydes House and Maister House, also on the High Street, the Grade I listed building was formerly a merchant's house with access to quayside on the River Hull.

== History ==
The house was built c.1656, in an Artisan Mannerist style. It was altered in c.1730, and had sash windows inserted in c.1755-60. It was bought by Hull City Corporation in 1903, and became a museum dedicated to Wilberforce in 1906. The museum re-opened on 25 March 2007, after a two-year £1.6 million redevelopment, in time for the 200th anniversary of Wilberforce's Act of Parliament abolishing the slave trade in the British Empire. The house was forced to close in 2020 because of the COVID-19 pandemic, taking the opportunity to refresh its offer and undertake vital repairs. The building reopened to the public in May 2023.

== Description ==
The front garden, named after Nelson Mandela, contains a statue of Wilberforce which underwent a £10,000 restoration in 2011. The statue was designated a Grade II* structure in 1994 and is now recorded in the National Heritage List for England, maintained by Historic England. Adjoining the site is Oriel Chambers, the home of the University of Hull's Wilberforce Institute for the Study of Slavery and Emancipation, which conducts research into historic and contemporary forms of slavery.

The house also exhibits the East Yorkshire regimental collection.

== In popular media ==
In the 2023 Netflix miniseries Bodies, Wilberforce House stood in as Harker House, the home of the main antagonist.

== See also ==
- Grade I listed buildings in the East Riding of Yorkshire
- Listed buildings in Kingston upon Hull (Myton Ward)
