= Peregrine Pelham =

English Member of Parliament and one of the regicides of King Charles I

Sir Peregrine Pelham (died 1650) was an English member of parliament and one of the regicides of King Charles I.

Pelham was a prosperous merchant in Kingston upon Hull before becoming town sheriff in 1636 and the MP for Kingston upon Hull in 1641. In 1642 along with Sir John Hotham, he barred the entry of King Charles into the city, and was present at the siege in the early part of the Civil War. Pelham and Hotham later fell out and, after Hotham was put on trial for allegedly betraying Hull to the Royalists, Pelham signed his death warrant.

During the Second Civil War, Pelham again defended Hull. In January 1649, as a commissioner of the High Court of Justice at the trial of King Charles, he was 20th of the 59 signatories on the death warrant of the King. He also served as Mayor of Hull in that year. He died in 1650.
