= Joseph Page =

Joseph Page may refer to:

- Joseph Page (cricketer), New Zealand cricketer
- Joseph Page (architect), English architect
- Joe Page, American baseball pitcher
