= Rupert Alec-Smith =

English historian and politician

Rupert Alexander Alec-Smith, TD (5 September 1913, Beverley, Yorkshire – 23 December 1983, Kingston upon Hull, Yorkshire) was an Englishman with an abiding interest in local history and founded the Georgian Society for East Yorkshire in 1937. In the Second World War, he served with the Green Howards in Cyprus.

In 1945, he stood for parliament at the general election for the Conservative Party in Kingston upon Hull East. He came second in a three-way contest.

In 1946, he bought the Old Rectory at Winestead and employed Francis Johnson to restore it. He filled the Rectory with fittings from demolished Georgian buildings and began collecting memorabilia of the Maister family.

He was a Conservative councillor on Hull City Council, serving as the party's group leader in the late 1960s. When the Conservatives won control of the council in 1969 he became leader of the council. In 1970 he gave up the leadership in order to accept the more ceremonial role of Lord Mayor of Kingston upon Hull for 1970–71. He subsequently served as High Sheriff of Humberside in 1975 and was made Lord Lieutenant of Humberside in 1980.

His wife was Suzette Genevieve Alec-Smith (1918–1999).

His papers at the University of Hull include c. 3,000 items from the fourteenth century onward, including title deeds, settlements, rentals, enclosure acts, maps and plans and house sale catalogues for East Yorkshire including manorial records 1647–1927 for Elstronwick.

Personal papers include over 500 letters of his parents, Alexander Alec-Smith and Adelaide Alec-Smith (née Horsley), largely sent during the First World War, and about 300 letters Rupert Alec-Smith sent during the Second World War. His journals and diaries survive for 1937–1970 as does his correspondence with good friend John Betjeman from 1954 to 1973.

Honorary titles
Preceded by The Earl of Halifax	Lord Lieutenant of Humberside; 1980–1983	Succeeded by Richard Anthony Bethell
