= Shirley Heights (horse) =

British Thoroughbred racehorse

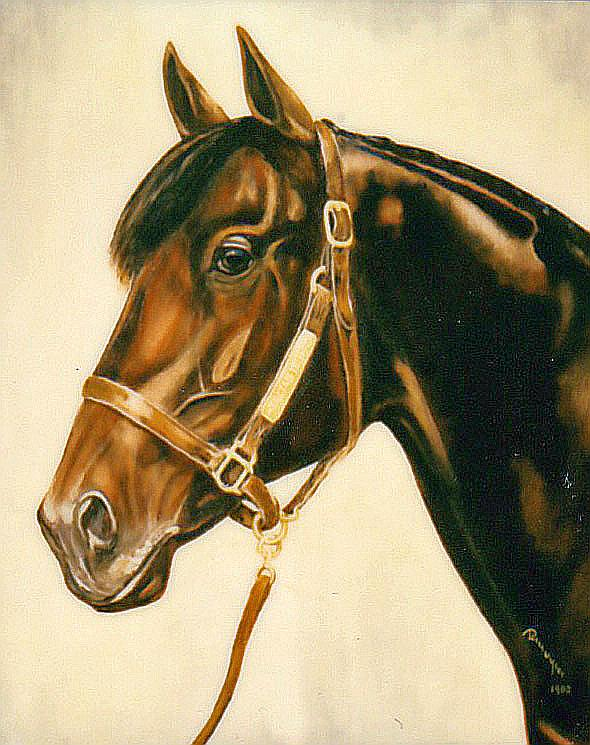
- Shirley Heights, oil on canvas, painted by Bob Demuyser (1920-2003)
- Sire: Mill Reef
- Grandsire: Never Bend
- Dam: Hardiemma
- Damsire: Hardicanute
- Sex: Stallion
- Foaled: 1975
- Country: Great Britain
- Colour: Bay
- Breeder: 2nd Earl of Halifax and Lord Irwin
- Owner: 2nd Earl of Halifax
- Trainer: John Dunlop
- Record: 11: 6-3-1
- Earnings: $378,586

Major wins
- Royal Lodge Stakes (1977); Heathorn Stakes (1978); Dante Stakes (1978); Epsom Derby (1978); Irish Derby (1978); Timeform rating: 130
- Last updated on 23 August 2022

Shirley Heights (1 March 1975 – 17 March 1997) was a British Thoroughbred race horse and winner of the Derby in 1978. The colt had previously won the Royal Lodge Stakes and the Dante Stakes, and he went on to win the Irish Derby before his racing career was ended by injury. He became a highly successful breeding stallion.

== Background ==
Shirley Heights was a bay horse bred by his owners, the father and son team of Charles Wood, 2nd Earl of Halifax, and Lord Irwin. He was one of many successful racehorses sired by Mill Reef, an American-bred horse who won the Epsom Derby, King George VI and Queen Elizabeth Stakes and Prix de l'Arc de Triomphe in 1971. The successes of Shirley Heights enabled Mill Reef to win the first of his two British sires' championships in 1978. His dam Hardiemma was a highly successful broodmare whose other descendants include Pentire and Divine Proportions.

The name Shirley Heights comes from a military lookout point in Antigua Mill Reef had been named after the Mill Reef Club on the same island. The colt was trained throughout his racing career by John Dunlop at Arundel in West Sussex.

== Racing career ==
Shirley Heights showed promise as a two-year-old, winning twice from six attempts and notably taking the one-mile Royal Lodge Stakes at Ascot Racecourse in September at odds of 10/1. The Royal Lodge was the first time he was ridden by Greville Starkey, who had taken over from the Australian veteran Ron Hutchinson as the principal jockey to the Dunlop stable.

The colt began his three-year-old season by finishing second behind Whitstead in the Classic Trial Stakes and then he won the Heathorn Stakes at Newmarket Racecourse, beating future King George VI and Queen Elizabeth Stakes winner Ile de Bourbon. At York Racecourse in May he defeated a field including the future St Leger Stakes winner Julio Mariner in the Dante Stakes, one of the leading trial races for the Epsom Derby at odds of 10/1. His "smooth victory" established him as a leading contender for the Epsom classic.

At Epsom in June, Shirley Heights started at odds of 8/1 in a field of twenty-five runners for the Derby, with Inkerman, ridden by Lester Piggott being made 4/1 favourite in what was considered a substandard renewal of the race. The 25/1 outsider Hawaiian Sound, ridden by the American Willie Shoemaker took the lead soon after the start, and led the field into the straight as Shirley Heights appeared to be struggling with the downhill section course. A furlong from the finish, Hawaiian Sound looked the likely winner but Shirley Heights was making rapid progress in fourth. In the final strides, Starkey drove Shirley Heights through along the inside rail and won a photo-finish by a head from Hawaiian Sound with the 40/1 shot Remainder Man in third.

On 2 July Shirley Heights started 5/4 favourite for the Irish Derby at the Curragh and won by a short head from Exdirectory with Hawaiian Sound third. He became the sixth horse to complete the Derby double after Orby, Santa Claus, Nijinsky, Grundy and The Minstrel.

In August, Shirley Heights was being prepared for a run in the St Leger Stakes when he broke down injured in training and was retired.

== Assessment ==
Shirley Heights was given a rating of 130 by the independent Timeform organisation, placing him eight pounds behind the top-rated horse Alleged. In their book A Century of Champions, John Randall and Tony Morris rated Shirley Heights an “inferior” Derby winner.

== Stud record ==
Shirley Heights became a breeding stallion at the Royal Stud at Sandringham, Norfolk. In his second year at stud Shirley Heights sired Darshaan, who won the 1984 Prix du Jockey Club (beating Sadler's Wells and Rainbow Quest) before becoming a highly successful breeding stallion. His next crop of foals produced Slip Anchor, who won the Derby by seven lengths in 1985. His other major winners included Infamy (Rothmans International) Arcadian Heights and Shady Heights. He was also the damsire of Lady Carla, In The Wings and Solemia. Shirley Heights was euthanized on 17 March 1997.

== Pedigree ==
Pedigree of Shirley Heights, bay stallion, 1975
| Sire Mill Reef (USA) 1968 | Never Bend (USA); 1960 | Nasrullah | Nearco |
| Sire Mill Reef (USA) 1968 | Never Bend (USA); 1960 | Nasrullah | Mumtaz Begum |
| Sire Mill Reef (USA) 1968 | Never Bend (USA); 1960 | Lalun | Djeddah |
| Sire Mill Reef (USA) 1968 | Never Bend (USA); 1960 | Lalun | Be Faithful |
| Sire Mill Reef (USA) 1968 | Milan Mill (USA); 1962 | Princequillo | Prince Rose |
| Sire Mill Reef (USA) 1968 | Milan Mill (USA); 1962 | Princequillo | Cosquilla |
| Sire Mill Reef (USA) 1968 | Milan Mill (USA); 1962 | Virginia Water | Count Fleet |
| Sire Mill Reef (USA) 1968 | Milan Mill (USA); 1962 | Virginia Water | Red Ray |
| Dam Hardiemma (GB) 1969 | Hardicanute (GB); 1962 | Hard Ridden | Hard Sauce |
| Dam Hardiemma (GB) 1969 | Hardicanute (GB); 1962 | Hard Ridden | Toute Belle |
| Dam Hardiemma (GB) 1969 | Hardicanute (GB); 1962 | Harvest Maid | Umidwar |
| Dam Hardiemma (GB) 1969 | Hardicanute (GB); 1962 | Harvest Maid | Hay Fell |
| Dam Hardiemma (GB) 1969 | Grand Cross (GB); 1952 | Grandmaster | Atout Maitre |
| Dam Hardiemma (GB) 1969 | Grand Cross (GB); 1952 | Grandmaster | Honorarium |
| Dam Hardiemma (GB) 1969 | Grand Cross (GB); 1952 | Blue Cross | Blue Peter |
| Dam Hardiemma (GB) 1969 | Grand Cross (GB); 1952 | Blue Cross | Kings Cross (Family:1-l) |
