= Earl of Halifax =

Earldom in the Peerage of Great Britain

- Blazon Arms: Quarterly: 1st & 4th, Azure, three naked Savages ambulant in fess proper, in the dexter hand of each a Shield Argent, charged with a Cross Gules, and in the sinister a Club resting on the shoulder proper, on a Canton Ermine, three Lozenges conjoined in fess Sable (Wood); 2nd & 3rd, Paly bendy Or and Azure, a Canton Ermine (Buck). Crest: A naked Savage ambulant proper, in the dexter hand a Shield Sable, charged with a Griffin’s Head erased Argent and in the sinister a Club resting on the shoulder proper. Supporters: On either side a Griffin Sable, gorged with a Collar, pendant therefrom a Portcullis Or.
- Creation date: 11 July 1944
- Creation: Fourth
- Created by: King George VI
- Peerage: Peerage of the United Kingdom
- First holder: Edward Wood, 3rd Viscount Halifax
- Present holder: Peter Wood, 3rd Earl of Halifax
- Heir apparent: James Wood, Lord Irwin
- Remainder to: the 1st Earl's heirs male of the body
- Subsidiary titles: Viscount Halifax; Baron Irwin; Baronet Wood of Barnsley
- Status: Extant
- Seat: Garrowby Hall
- Motto: I LIKE MY CHOICE

Earl of Halifax is a title that has been created four times in British history—once in the Peerage of England, twice in the Peerage of Great Britain, and once in the Peerage of the United Kingdom. The name of the peerage refers to the town of Halifax in West Yorkshire.

The first and fourth creations were elevations for the holders of the first and second creations of the title Viscount Halifax. The holder of the first creation was later granted the title Marquess of Halifax. The second and third creations were for closely related male members of the Montagu family, landed gentry since the Norman Conquest, and spanned most of the years 1689–1771.

The fourth creation was in 1944 for Lord Halifax, the former viceroy of India (who was the 3rd Viscount Halifax before his elevation to the earldom). He was a prominent 1930s minister, who declined the possibility of becoming Prime Minister on the resignation of Neville Chamberlain, in favour of Winston Churchill.

== History of the title ==
=== 1679 creation ===
The first creation, in the Peerage of England in 1679, was for George Savile, 1st Viscount Halifax. He had already been made Baron Savile of Elland and Viscount Halifax in 1668, and was later made Marquess of Halifax (this creation of the earldom became extinct in 1700; see Marquess of Halifax for more information).

=== 1714 and 1715 creations ===
The title was recreated in 1714 for Charles Montagu, 1st Baron Halifax, First Lord of the Treasury to George I, along with the courtesy title of Viscount Sunbury. Both titles were created with remainder to heirs male. A member of the prominent Montagu family, he was the son of George Montagu, younger son of Henry Montagu, 1st Earl of Manchester (see the Duke of Manchester article). Montagu had already been created Baron Halifax, of Halifax in the County of York, in 1700, with remainder, failing heirs male of his own, to his nephew George, son and heir of his brother Edward Montagu.

On Lord Halifax's death in 1715 the viscountcy and earldom became extinct. He was succeeded in the barony according to the special remainder by his nephew George Montagu. Less than a month after his uncle's death, both titles were revived in his favour, making him Earl of Halifax and Viscount Sunbury. He was succeeded by his son, the second Earl, who was a prominent statesman. However, on his death in 1771 all the titles became extinct.

=== 1944 creation ===
The title was created for a fourth time in the Peerage of the United Kingdom in 1944 for Edward Wood, 3rd Viscount Halifax, the former Foreign Secretary and former Viceroy of India. The Wood family descends from Francis Wood, of Barnsley. His second son, Francis Wood, was created a baronet, of Barnsley in the County of York, in 1784, with remainder to his elder brother, the Reverend Henry Wood, and failing him to the sons of his younger brother, Charles Wood (who had died two years earlier). He was succeeded according to the special remainder by his nephew, the second Baronet (the son of Charles Wood).

His son, the third Baronet, was a prominent Liberal politician and served as Chancellor of the Exchequer from 1846 to 1852, during which he became notorious for the policies he followed during the Great Famine in Ireland. In 1866 he was created Viscount Halifax, of Monk Bretton in the West Riding of the County of York, in the Peerage of the United Kingdom. His aforementioned grandson, the third Viscount, was also a noted politician. In 1925, nine years before he succeeded his father, he was himself raised to the Peerage of the United Kingdom as Baron Irwin, of Kirby Underdale in the County of York. In 1944 he was further honoured when he was made Earl of Halifax. As of 2018 the titles are held by his grandson, the third Earl, who succeeded his father in 1980.

Another member of the Wood family was the Conservative politician Richard Wood, Baron Holderness. He was the second son of the first Earl of Halifax.

The dynastic motto is "I like my choice", originally "Perseverando" (Latin for "Persevering"), changed after the 1st Earl's decision to abandon his office in the household of the Prince of Wales.

The family seat is Garrowby Hall, near Garrowby in the East Riding of Yorkshire.

== Earl of Halifax, first creation ==
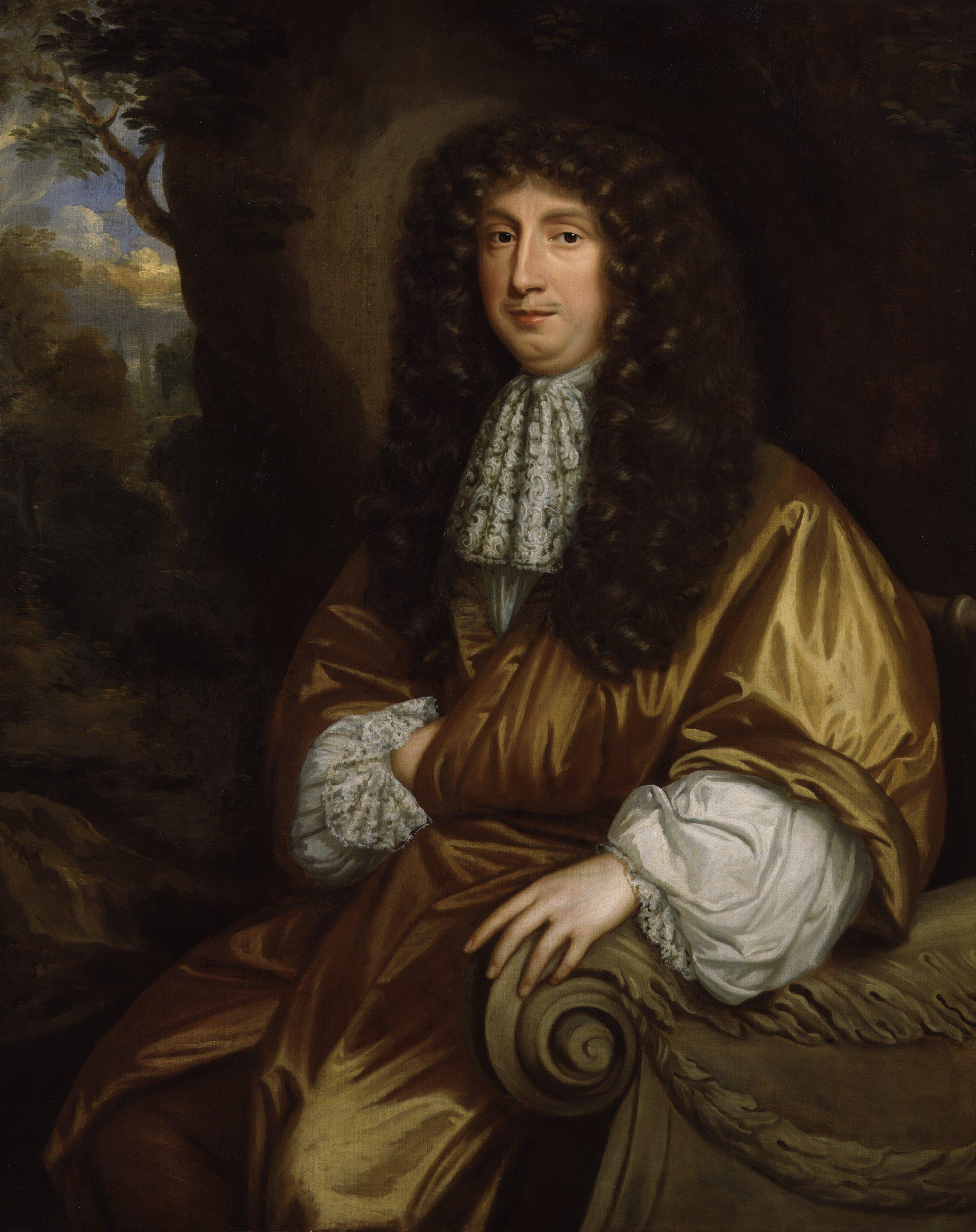
George Savile, 1st Marquess of Halifax

=== Viscount Halifax, first creation (1668) ===
- George Savile, 1st Viscount Halifax (1633–1695) (created Earl of Halifax in 1679)

=== Earl of Halifax (1679) ===
- George Savile, 1st Earl of Halifax (1633–1695) (created Marquess of Halifax in 1682)

=== Marquess of Halifax (1682) ===
- George Savile, 1st Marquess of Halifax (1633–1695)
- William Savile, 2nd Marquess of Halifax (1665–1700)

== Earl of Halifax, second and third creations ==
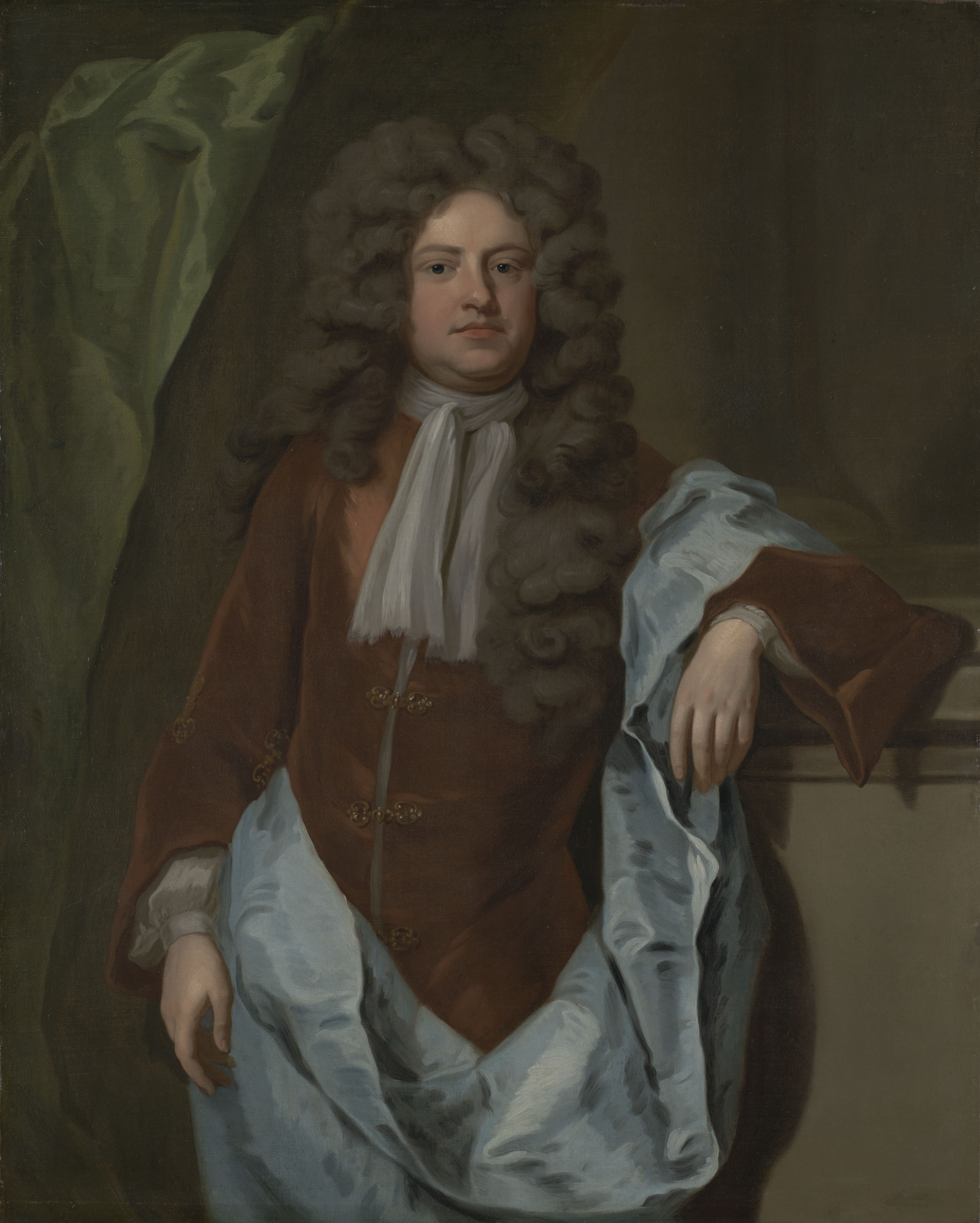
Charles Montagu, 1st Earl of Halifax

=== Baron Halifax (1700) ===
- Charles Montagu, 1st Baron Halifax (1661–1715) (created Earl of Halifax in 1714)

=== Earl of Halifax (1714) ===
- Charles Montagu, 1st Earl of Halifax (1661–1715)

=== Baron Halifax (1700; reverted) ===
- George Montagu, 2nd Baron Halifax (1685–1739) (created Earl of Halifax in 1715)

=== Earl of Halifax (1715) ===
- George Montagu, 1st Earl of Halifax (1685–1739)
- George Montagu-Dunk, 2nd Earl of Halifax (1716–1771)

=== Title succession chart ===
Title succession chart, Barons Halifax and Earls of Halifax (second and third creations).
See also: Montagu family tree

Hon. George Montagu; 1622–1681
Baron Halifax; Viscount Sunbury; Earl of Halifax (second creation)
Edward Montagu; 1649–1690	Charles Montagu; 1st Baron Halifax; 1st Earl of Halifax; 1661–1715
Viscountcy and earldom extinct
Viscount Sunbury; Earl of Halifax (third creation)
George Montagu; 2nd Baron Halifax; 1st Earl of Halifax; 1685–1739
George Montagu-Dunk; 2nd Earl of Halifax; 1716–1771
Barony, viscountcy and earldom extinct

== Earl of Halifax, fourth creation ==
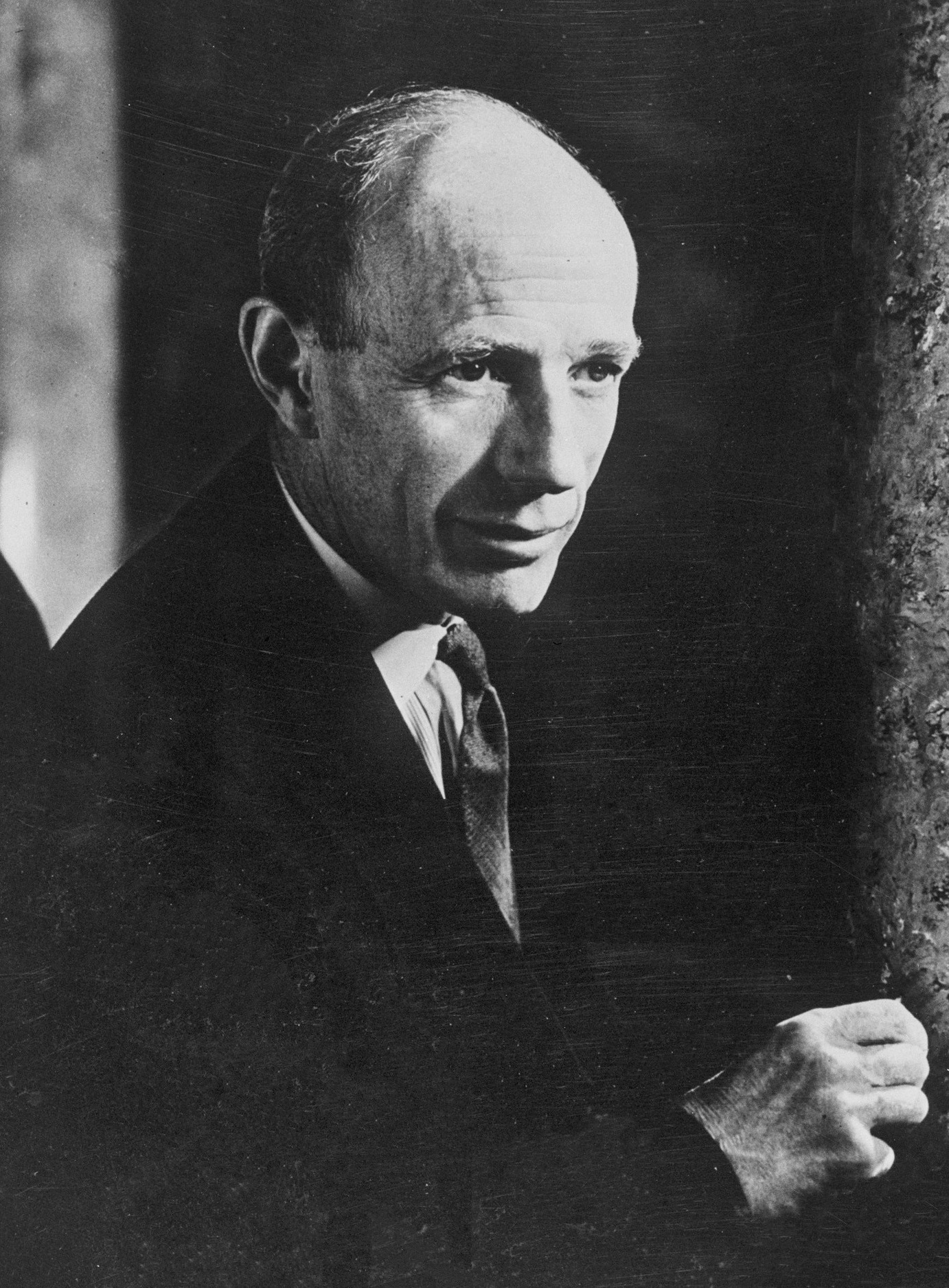
Edward Wood, 1st Earl of Halifax

=== Wood baronets, of Barnsley (1784) ===
- Sir Francis Wood, 1st Baronet (1729–1795)
- Sir Francis Lindley Wood, 2nd Baronet (1771–1846)
- Sir Charles Wood, 3rd Baronet (1800–1885) (created Viscount Halifax in 1866)

=== Viscount Halifax, second creation (1866) ===
- Charles Wood, 1st Viscount Halifax (1800–1885)
- Charles Lindley Wood, 2nd Viscount Halifax (1839–1934)
- Edward Frederick Lindley Wood, 3rd Viscount Halifax (1881–1959) (created Baron Irwin in 1925 and Earl of Halifax in 1944)

=== Earl of Halifax (1944) ===
- Edward Frederick Lindley Wood, 1st Earl of Halifax (1881–1959)
- Charles Ingram Courtenay Wood, 2nd Earl of Halifax (1912–1980)
- (Charles Edward) Peter Neil Wood, 3rd Earl of Halifax (born 1944)

The heir apparent is the present holder's only son, James Charles Wood, Lord Irwin (born 1977).
The heir apparent's heir apparent is his only son, Hon. Rex Patrick Wood (born 2010).

=== Title succession chart ===
Title succession chart, Wood baronets (of Barnsley), Viscounts Halifax (second creation) and Earls of Halifax (fourth creation).

Francis Wood; 1696–1775
Rev. Henry Wood; 1726–1790	Sir Francis Wood; 1st Baronet; 1729–1795	Capt. Charles Wood; 1731–1782
Sir Francis Wood; 2nd Baronet; 1771–1846
Viscount Halifax
Charles Wood; 1st Viscount Halifax; 3rd Baronet; 1800–1885
Charles Wood; 2nd Viscount Halifax; 1839–1934
Baron Irwin; Earl of Halifax
Hon. Charles Wood; 1870–1890	Hon. Francis Wood; 1871–1889	Hon. Henry Wood; 1879–1886	Edward Wood; 1st Baron Irwin; 3rd Viscount Halifax; 1st Earl of Halifax; 1881–1959
Charles Wood; 2nd Earl of Halifax; 1912–1980
Peter Wood; 3rd Earl of Halifax born 1944
James Wood; Lord Irwin born 1977
Hon. Rex Wood born 2010

=== Line of succession ===
Line of succession

Only the first three in the line of succession are in remainder to the earldom and its subsidiary titles. All in the line of succession are in remainder to the earlier created viscountcy and its subsidiary titles.

- Charles Wood, 1st Viscount Halifax (1800–1885)
  - Charles Lindley Wood, 2nd Viscount Halifax (1839–1934)
    - Edward Frederick Lindley Wood, 1st Earl of Halifax (1881–1959)
      - Charles Ingram Courtenay Wood, 2nd Earl of Halifax (1912–1980)
        - (Charles Edward) Peter Neil Wood, 3rd Earl of Halifax (born 1944)
          - (1) James Charles Wood, Lord Irwin (born 1977)
            - (2) Hon. Rex Patrick Wood (born 2010)
      - Richard Frederick Wood, Baron Holderness (1920–2002)
        - (3) Hon. Edward Orlando Charles Wood (born 1951)
  - Hon. Frederick George Lindley Meynell (1846–1910)
    - Col. Francis Hugo Lindley Meynell (1880–1941)
      - Col. Hugo Meynell (1909–1960)
        - Nicholas Edward Hugo Meynell (1937–1988)
          - (4) Hugo Graham Nicholas Meynell (born 1970)
          - (5) Alexander Frederick Miles Meynell (born 1972)
        - David Christian Francis Meynell (1940–2001)
          - (6) Charles Christian George Meynell (born 1964)
            - (7) Cosmo Frederick Charles Meynell (born 1995)
            - (8) Felix Meynell
            - (9) Hector Edward Hugo Meynell (born 2005)
      - Rev. Mark Meynell (1914–2006)
        - (10) Christopher Mark Meynell (born 1941)
          - (11) Rev. Mark John Henry Meynell (born 1970)
          - (12) Guy Francis Meynell (born 1973)
        - (13) Rev. Andrew Francis Meynell (born 1943)
          - (14) Aidan Jonathan Charles Meynell (born 1974)
        - (15) Peter John Meynell (born 1947)
          - (16) Marten Charles Meynell (born 1977)
    - Capt. Charles Wilfred Lindley Meynell (1890–1976)
      - Richard Walter Meynell (1923–2010)
        - (17) Anthony Charles Meynell (born 1952)
          - (18) Wilfrid Meynell (born 1986)
        - (19) Charles Humphrey Meynell (born 1954)

Baronetage of Great Britain
Preceded by Pepys baronets	Wood baronets of Barnsley; 22 January 1784	Succeeded by FitzHerbert baronets
