= 1937 York by-election =

1937 UK parliamentary by-election

The 1937 York by-election was held on 6 May 1937. The by-election was held due to the elevation to the peerage of the incumbent Conservative MP, Lawrence Lumley. It was won by the Conservative candidate Charles Wood.

York by-election, 1937
Party	Candidate	Votes	%	±%
Conservative	Charles Wood	22,045	55.07	−1.96
Labour	John Dugdale	17,986	44.93	+1.96
Majority		4,059	10.14	−3.92
Turnout		40,031		
Conservative hold		Swing		
