= Peter Wood, 3rd Earl of Halifax =

British peer and politician

The Right Honourable The Earl of Halifax KStJ JP DL
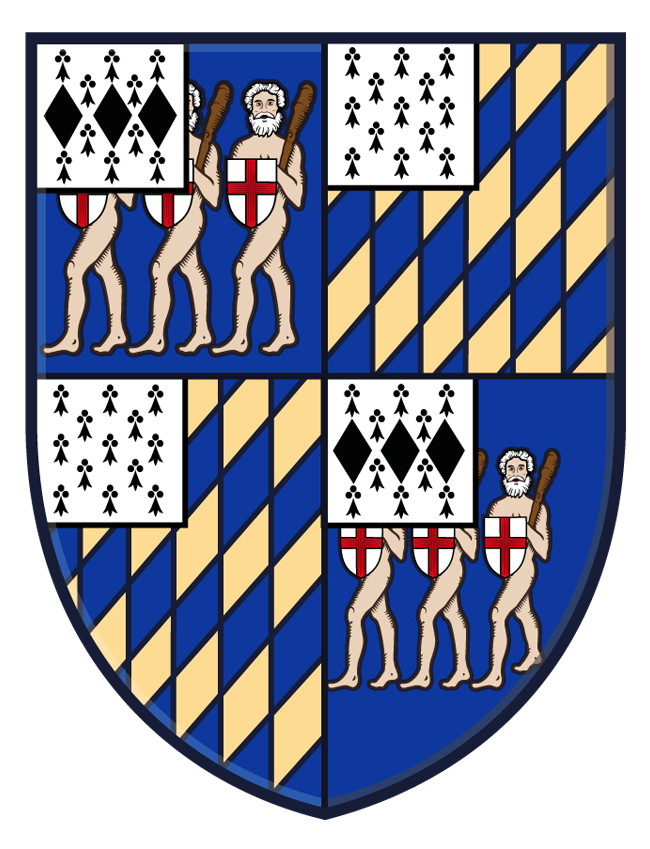
- Arms of the Earl of Halifax

Member of the House of Lords
- Lord Temporal
- In office 19 March 1980 – 11 November 1999 as a hereditary peer
- Preceded by: The 2nd Earl of Halifax
- Succeeded by: Seat abolished (Note: Pursuant to the House of Lords Act 1999.)

Personal details
- Born: 14 March 1944 (age 82) Yorkshire, England
- Party: Conservative
- Spouse: Camilla Younger (m. 1976)
- Children: 2
- Parent(s): Charles Wood, 2nd Earl of Halifax; Ruth Primrose
- Relatives: Edward Wood, 1st Earl of Halifax (paternal grandfather); Neil Primrose (maternal grandfather); Archibald Primrose, 5th Earl of Rosebery (great-grandfather)
- Education: Eton College; Christ Church, Oxford

Charles Edward Peter Neil Wood, 3rd Earl of Halifax (born 14 March 1944), is a British peer and Conservative politician.

== Background ==
Lord Halifax is the third child and only son of Charles Wood, 2nd Earl of Halifax, a grandson of Edward Wood, 1st Earl of Halifax, Viceroy of India and Foreign Secretary. His mother, Ruth Wood (née Primrose), Countess of Halifax, was a daughter of Neil Primrose, and a granddaughter of Archibald Primrose, 5th Earl of Rosebery, Prime Minister of the United Kingdom, and Edward Stanley, 17th Earl of Derby.

He was brought up at Swinford Paddocks, Newmarket, and educated at Eton and Christ Church, Oxford.

== Career ==
As Peter Wood, he unsuccessfully contested Dearne Valley as a Conservative candidate at the February general election of 1974 and the October general election of the same year. On 19 March 1980, he succeeded to the titles of 3rd Earl of Halifax, 7th Baronet Wood, of Barnsley in the County of York, 5th Viscount Halifax of Monk Bretton, in the West Riding of the County of Yorkshire, and 3rd Baron Irwin, of Kirby Underdale in the County of York.

Lord Halifax held the office of Deputy Lieutenant (DL) of Humberside between 1983 and 1996. He held the office of Justice of the Peace (JP) for Wilton Beacon in 1985 and the office of High Steward of York Minster in 1988. Wood held the office of Vice-Lord-Lieutenant of the East Riding, Yorkshire, in 1996. He is a Knight of St John and JP.

Lord Halifax was a non-executive director of Hambros Bank (1981–1998), the Vice-Chairman of Christie, Manson & Woods (the European Division of Christie's international fine arts auctioneers) (resigned as a director 2001), and a director of Yorkshire Post Newspapers Ltd (until 1997). He serves as a Board Governor for The Pocklington School Foundation. He is the President of the Leeds Art Collections Fund, the Vice President of the Yorkshire Society, and was a member (2005–2016) of the Board of Directors of Jockey Club Estates. The Earl and Countess of Halifax are active members of the Jockey Club. They were invited to ride in the King's procession at Royal Ascot 2023.

== Family ==
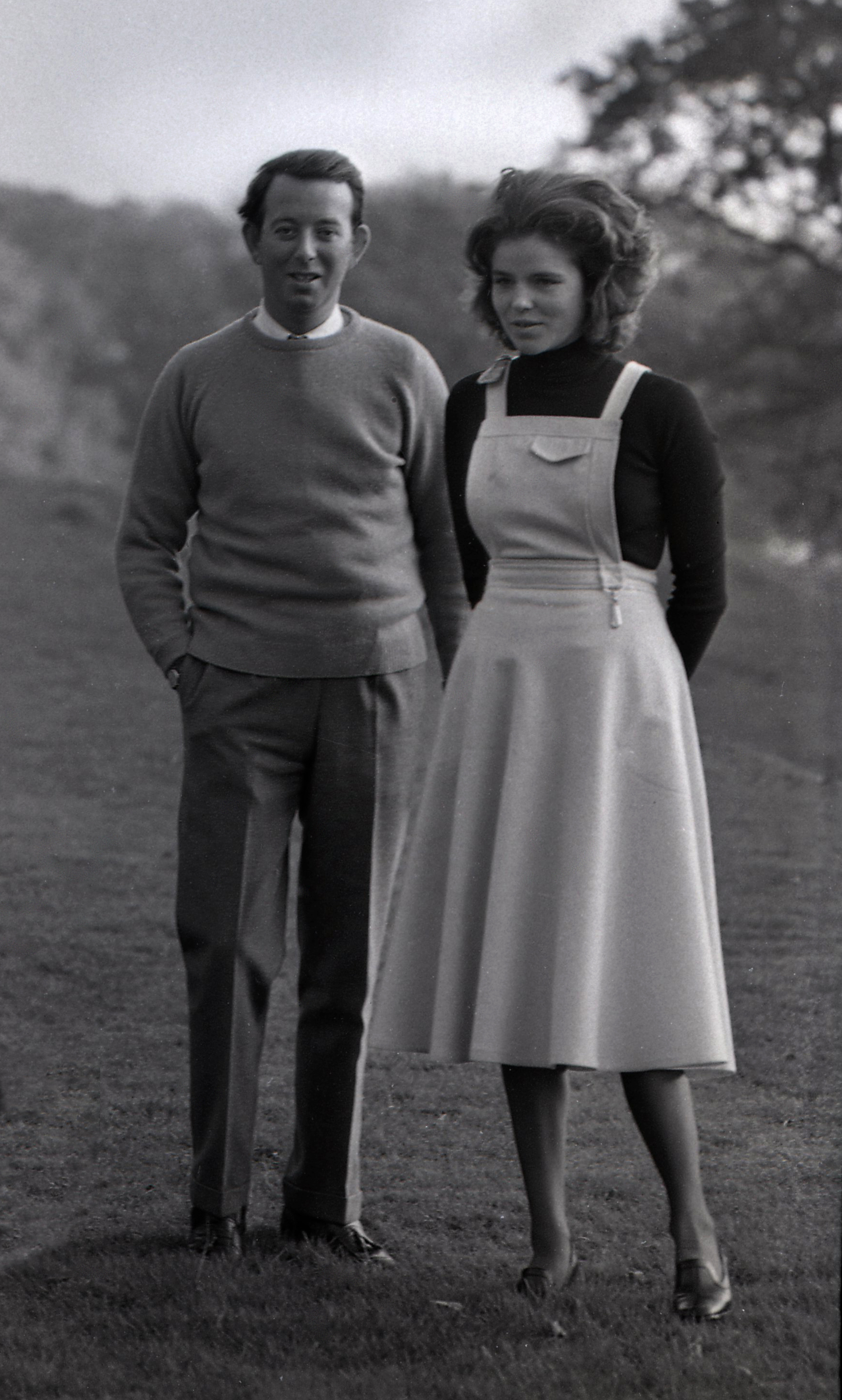
The Earl and Countess of Halifax – Peter and Camilla Wood, 1976.

In 1976, Lord Halifax (then Lord Irwin) (who had once been minded for a potential husband of Princess Anne) married Camilla Younger, of the Scottish brewing family, former wife of Richard Parker Bowles (married in 1973 and divorced in 1976), a younger brother of Andrew Parker Bowles, first husband of Queen Camilla. The Countess of Halifax and Queen Camilla are former sisters-in-law.

The Countess of Halifax has a daughter from her first marriage with Richard Parker Bowles:

- Emma Parker Bowles (born 1974).

The Earl and Countess of Halifax live on the 20,000-acre family estate Garrowby Hall near Garrowby, East Riding of Yorkshire. Lady Halifax is the national president of Macmillan Cancer Support.

== Notes ==
Peerage of the United Kingdom
Preceded by Charles Wood	Earl of Halifax; 4th creation 1980–present Member of the House of Lords (1980–1999)	Incumbent; Heir apparent: James Wood, Lord Irwin
Preceded by Charles Wood	Viscount Halifax; 2nd creation 1980–present	Incumbent; Heir apparent: James Wood, Lord Irwin
Preceded by Charles Wood	Baron Irwin; 1980–present	Incumbent; Heir apparent: James Wood, Lord Irwin
Baronetage of Great Britain
Preceded by Charles Wood	Baronet of Barnsley; 1980–present	Incumbent; Heir apparent: James Wood, Lord Irwin
