= Charles Wood, 2nd Earl of Halifax =

British politician and peer

The Right Honourable The Earl of Halifax DL
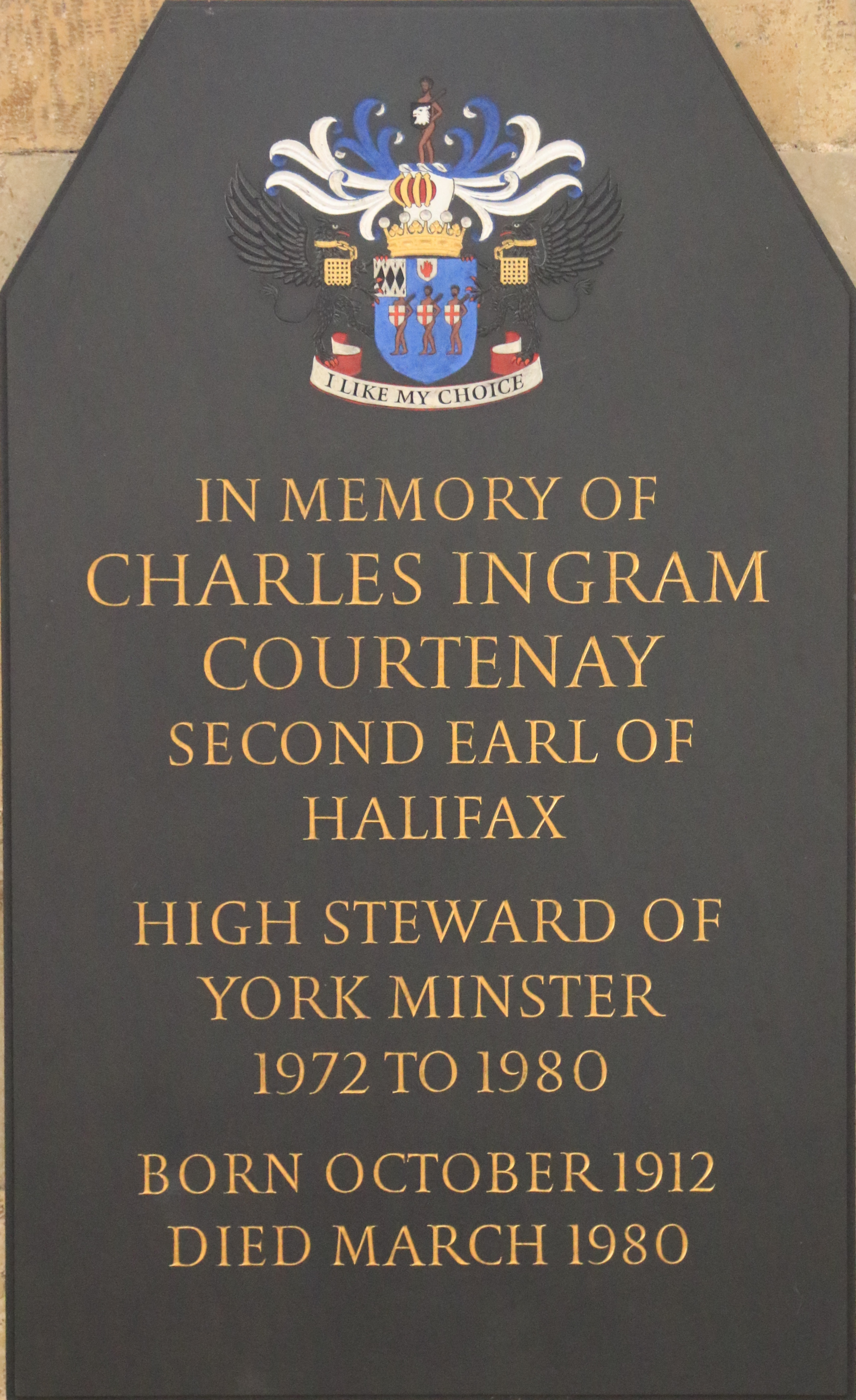
- Memorial in York Minster

Member of the House of Lords
- Lord Temporal
- In office 23 December 1959 – 19 March 1980
- Preceded by: The 1st Earl of Halifax
- Succeeded by: The 3rd Earl of Halifax

Member of Parliament for York
- In office 6 May 1937 – 15 June 1945
- Preceded by: Roger Lumley
- Succeeded by: John Corlett

Personal details
- Born: Charles Ingram Courtenay Wood; 3 October 1912 Garrowby, Yorkshire, England
- Died: 19 March 1980 (aged 67) Garrowby, Yorkshire, England
- Party: Conservative
- Spouse: Ruth Primrose
- Children: 3, including Peter
- Parent(s): Edward Wood, 1st Earl of Halifax; Lady Dorothy Onslow
- Education: Christ Church, Oxford

Charles Ingram Courtenay Wood, 2nd Earl of Halifax (3 October 1912 – 19 March 1980), styled Hon. Charles Wood from 1925 until 1944 and Lord Irwin from 1944 until 1959, was a British peer, Conservative politician, Lord Lieutenant of Humberside and High Steward of York Minster.

== Early life and education ==
Wood was the son of Edward Wood, a Conservative politician, later created Earl of Halifax, Viceroy of India, and Foreign Secretary, by his marriage to Lady Dorothy Evelyn Augusta Onslow, a daughter of William Onslow, 4th Earl of Onslow, a former Governor-General of New Zealand. He was educated at Eton and Christ Church, Oxford, graduating in 1934 with a B.A. degree. He captained the Oxford University Polo Team in the same year.

== Career ==
In 1934, Wood was commissioned as a 2nd Lieutenant into the Royal Horse Guards. Like his father, in 1937 he entered politics as a Conservative, becoming Member of Parliament for the City of York. In 1939, at the outbreak of the Second World War, he rejoined the Royal Horse Guards and served for three years in the Middle East, continuing as a member of parliament during this time. At the 1945 general election, he lost his seat to the Labour candidate, John Corlett.

Wood was styled Lord Irwin between 1944 and 1959, when he succeeded his father as Earl of Halifax and joined the House of Lords. He was a Deputy Lieutenant of the East Riding in Yorkshire between 1955 and 1968, and Lord-Lieutenant of Humberside between 1974 and 1980. He was also High Steward of York Minster between 1972 until 1980.

In 1978, his horse Shirley Heights won the Derby.

The 2nd Earl of Halifax died in 1980 and was buried at All Saints' Church, Kirby Underdale, where a Halifax family memorial is to be found.

== Family ==
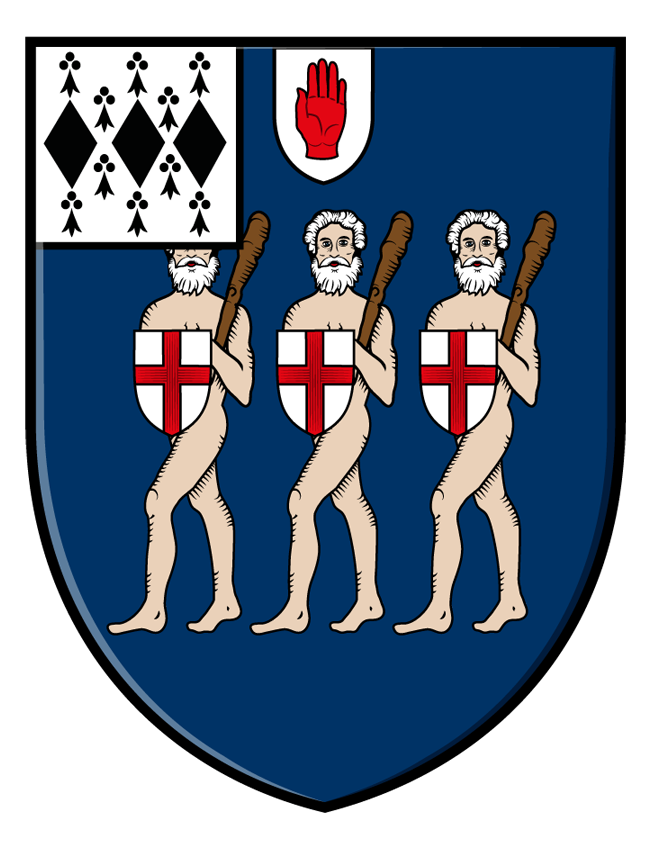
Arms of The Rt Hon Charles Ingram Courtenay Wood, the Second Earl of Halifax, and his descendants.

In 1936, he married Ruth Alice Hannah Mary Primrose (18 April 1916 – 1989), daughter of the Liberal politician Captain Neil James Archibald Primrose and Lady Victoria Alice Louise Primrose, née Stanley, a granddaughter of the Prime Minister Archibald Primrose, 5th Earl of Rosebery.

They had three children:

- Lady Caroline Victoria Wood (born 10 September 1937, died 15 November 2014), married, firstly, Randle J. Feilden in 1958 (divorced in 1970), secondly, John V. Gosling in 1970.
  - Virginia Mary Feilden (born 6 June 1959, died 24 March 1994)
  - Randle Charles Roderick Feilden (born 19 January 1961)
  - Fiona Caroline Feilden (born 26 January 1965)
- Lady Susan Diana Wood (born 22 September 1938), married Brigadier Ian Darsie Watson in 1959.
  - David Charles Darsie Watson (born 29 July 1960)
  - Richard Ian Watson (born 30 January 1962)
- The Rt Hon. (Charles Edward) Peter Neil Wood, 3rd Earl of Halifax (born 14 March 1944), married Camilla Parker Bowles (née Younger) in 1976
  - The Hon James Charles Wood, Lord Irwin (born 24 August 1977), heir apparent to the earldom, married Georgia E. Clarkson in 2006
    - Hon. Rex Patrick Wood (born 12 August 2010)
    - Hon. Audrey Nancy Wood (born 23 January 2013)
  - Lady Joanna Victoria Wood (born 15 January 1980)

Parliament of the United Kingdom
Preceded by Roger Lumley	Member of Parliament for the City of York; 1937–1945	Succeeded by John Corlett
Honorary titles
Preceded by The Lord Middleton	Lord Lieutenant of the East Riding of Yorkshire; 1968–1974	Office abolished
Peerage of the United Kingdom
Preceded by Edward Wood	Earl of Halifax; 4th creation 1960–1980; Member of the House of Lords (1960–1980)	Succeeded by Peter Wood
Preceded by Edward Wood	Viscount Halifax; 2nd creation 1960–1980	Succeeded by Peter Wood
Preceded by Edward Wood	Baron Irwin; 1960–1980	Succeeded by Peter Wood
Baronetage of Great Britain
Preceded by Edward Wood	Baronet of Barnsley; 1960–1980	Succeeded by Peter Wood
