= Blaydes House =

House in Kingston upon Hull, England

Coordinates: 53.745600°N 0.327700°W

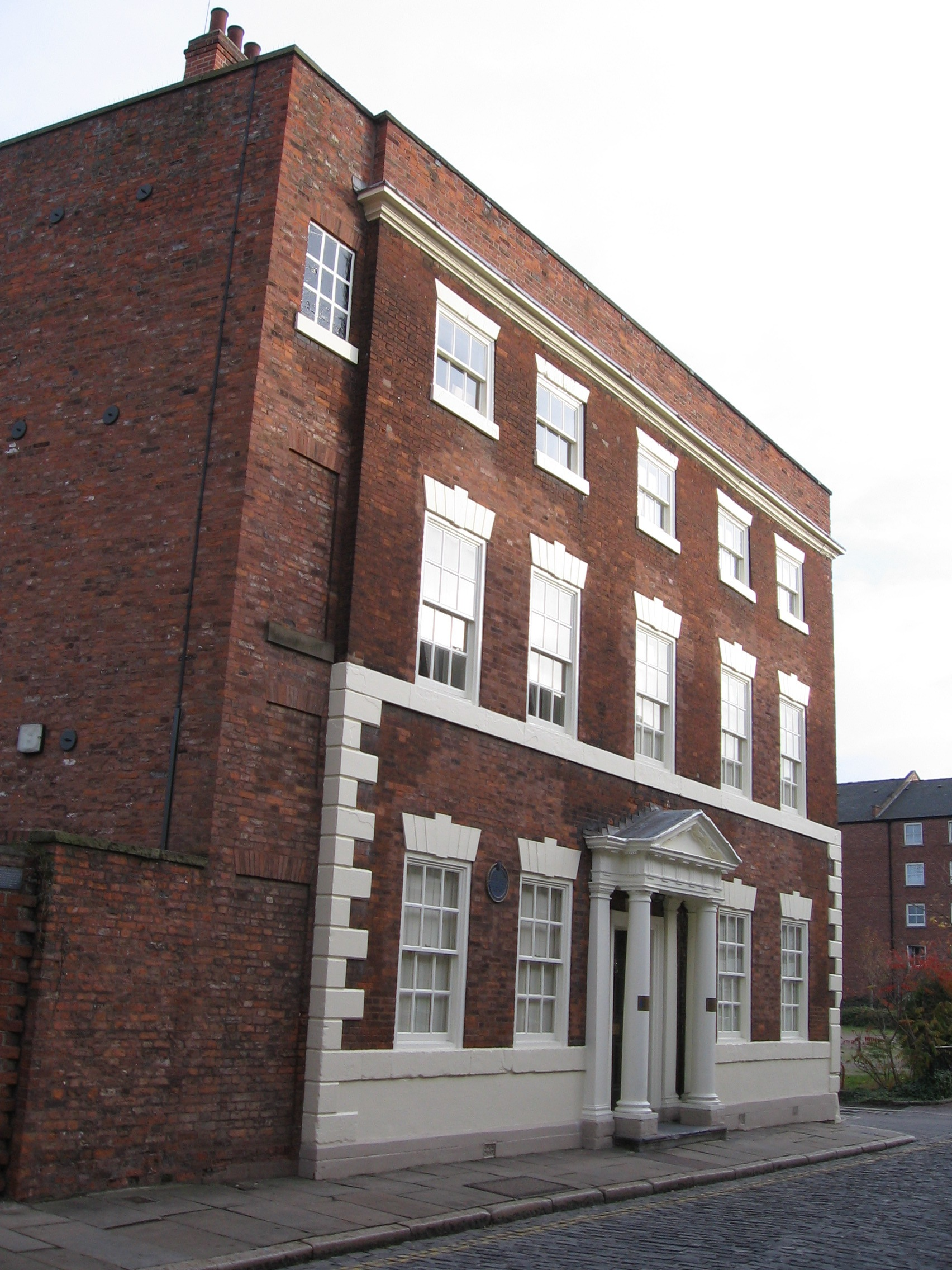
Blaydes House

Blaydes House is a grade II* listed Georgian house in High Street, Kingston upon Hull, England. Built in the 18th century for the Blaydes family, it is now owned by the University of Hull's Maritime Historical Studies Centre.

== History ==
Blaydes House was built in the late 1730s or early 1740s (the precise date is unknown) to the designs of the architect Joseph Page as the residence and business premises of the Blaydes family, one of the leading merchant families in the town and also owners of two shipyards, Blaydes Yard: the North End Dock on the River Hull, near the house, and another at Hessle Cliff, close to the northern end of the present-day Humber Bridge. The yards turned out vessels for the Royal Navy from the 1740s, but their main output was merchant ships, most famous among which was a collier named Bethia, which was purchased by the Navy in 1787, adapted and renamed HMS Bounty.

The Blaydes family were also prominent in town politics, Benjamin Blaydes (whose initials can be seen in a carved monogram in the hallway ceiling) serving as Chamberlain in 1736. The family probably remained at the house until the early 19th century, by that time trading as part of the Blaydes Loft Gee & Company partnership. After this firm was wound up the family left Hull and sold the house. Subsequently, it was used as office space by a number of local businesses.

In May 1941, during the Hull Blitz, a large office building immediately to the south was destroyed by a direct hit, but Blaydes House received only light damage.

== Current use ==
After a period of disuse the house was purchased by the Georgian Society for East Yorkshire. In 1999 it was sold to the University of Hull and refurbished to become the headquarters of the university's Maritime Historical Studies Centre.

== See also ==
- Grade II* listed buildings in the East Riding of Yorkshire
- Listed buildings in Kingston upon Hull (Myton Ward)
