= John Corlett (MP) =

Member of Parliament for York
- In office 5 July 1945 – 3 February 1950
- Preceded by: Charles Wood
- Succeeded by: Harry Hylton-Foster

Personal details
- Born: 10 October 1884 Lancashire, England, United Kingdom
- Died: 18 January 1968 (aged 83)
- Party: Labour

John Corlett (10 October 1884 – 18 January 1968) was a British Labour Party politician who sat in the House of Commons from 1945 to 1950 as the Member of Parliament for York.

== Life ==
Corlett was educated at the University of London, where he received a PhD. He became a divisional organiser for the National Union of Teachers, and stood unsuccessfully for the Labour Party in Stretford at the 1923 United Kingdom general election. He became the MP for York during the 1945 election in which Labour won with a landslide, winning the seat for Labour for the first time in 14 years with a 4,072 vote majority. His successor as the York Constituency candidate, Haydn Davies would lose the seat in the 1950 election to the Conservatives.

== The Standon Farm Inquiry ==
On 3 February 1947, the murder of a Master at the School at Standon Farm Approved School by several students was the subject to an inquiry. Chair John Cyril Maude and Corlett were selected to conduct this inquiry with PF Tipping as their Secretary. The original plan of the students had been to murder the Headteacher however, the plan had gone wrong resulting in the death of the Assistant Gardening Instructor, William Peter Fieldhouse. 5 boys were sentenced for the murder of Fieldhouse.

The result of the Inquiry was the recommendation for the closure of the school and the firing of the headmaster.

== Death ==
He died on 18 January 1968 at the age of 83.

Parliament of the United Kingdom
Preceded by Charles Wood	Member of Parliament for York; 1945–1950	Succeeded by Harry Hylton-Foster
