= Georgian Society for East Yorkshire =

The Georgian Society for East Yorkshire is the oldest group or society in the United Kingdom dedicated to the appreciation and preservation of Georgian architecture. The society is based in the East Riding of Yorkshire and is concerned with the preservation of buildings in the East Riding and Kingston-upon-Hull.

== History ==
The origin of the society was as a committee of the East Riding Antiquarian Society tasked with "making a list of buildings of that period in our Riding, and any other matters deemed necessary with regard to the preservation of Georgian buildings" by Rupert Alec-Smith in January 1937. In the late 1930s there was wide spread destruction of many Georgian Buildings which caused concern to a number of architects and historians; this concern was most prominently voiced by Robert Byron in his polemic article "How We Celebrate the Coronation" in the May 1937 edition of the Architectural Review. The first committee meeting was held on 2 June 1937; after which Rupert Alec-Smith wrote to Lord Derwent to invite him to become the society's President.

The architect Francis Johnson was invited to join the society in 1938 and became a very prominent member. His professional skills were called upon when the society bought and restored properties in Hull which had suffered bomb damage during World War II.

=== Properties bought and saved by the Georgian Society for East Yorkshire ===
- Maister House, Hull (the only National Trust property in the city)
- Blaydes House

== The Society's objectives ==
The society's objectives as stated on its website are:

1. To preserve buildings from destruction or disfigurement, especially those of the Georgian period, of architectural and historic interest in Hull and the East Riding.
2. To safeguard the setting of such buildings and to maintain or enhance the character of areas of architectural interest and scenic beauty.
3. To afford advice to owners and public authorities on the preservation and repair of such buildings and the uses to which they might be adapted, where necessary.
4. To stimulate public appreciation of the architectural and historic heritage of Hull and the East Riding.

The society also organizes an annual programme of visits to sites of interest (usually as coach trips) and lectures.

== Presidents ==
- The Lord Derwent 1937-49
- Lady Waechter de Grimston 1949-59
- Lt-Col Sir John Dunnington-Jefferson 1960-61
- Sir Richard Sykes, Bt. 1961-74
- Col Rupert Alec-Smith 1974-83
- John Gordon Lightowler 1999-2017
