= Lord Lieutenant of Humberside =

Ceremonial office

The Lord Lieutenants of Humberside.

The office was created on 1 April 1974, and abolished on 31 March 1996.

In 1996 the Lord Lieutenancy of the East Riding of Yorkshire was restored, covering what was northern Humberside. The southern part was ceded back to the Lord Lieutenancy of Lincolnshire.

== Lord Lieutenants of Humberside 1974-1996 ==
- Charles Wood, 2nd Earl of Halifax 1 April 1974 – 19 March 1980 (formerly Lord Lieutenant of the East Riding of Yorkshire)
- Rupert Alexander Alec-Smith 4 July 1980 – 18 October 1983
- Richard Anthony Bethell 18 October 1983 – 1 April 1996

== See also ==
- Vice-Lieutenants of Humberside
