= Edward Wood, 1st Earl of Halifax =

British politician (1881–1959)

The Right Honourable The Earl of Halifax KG OM GCSI GCMG GCIE TD PC
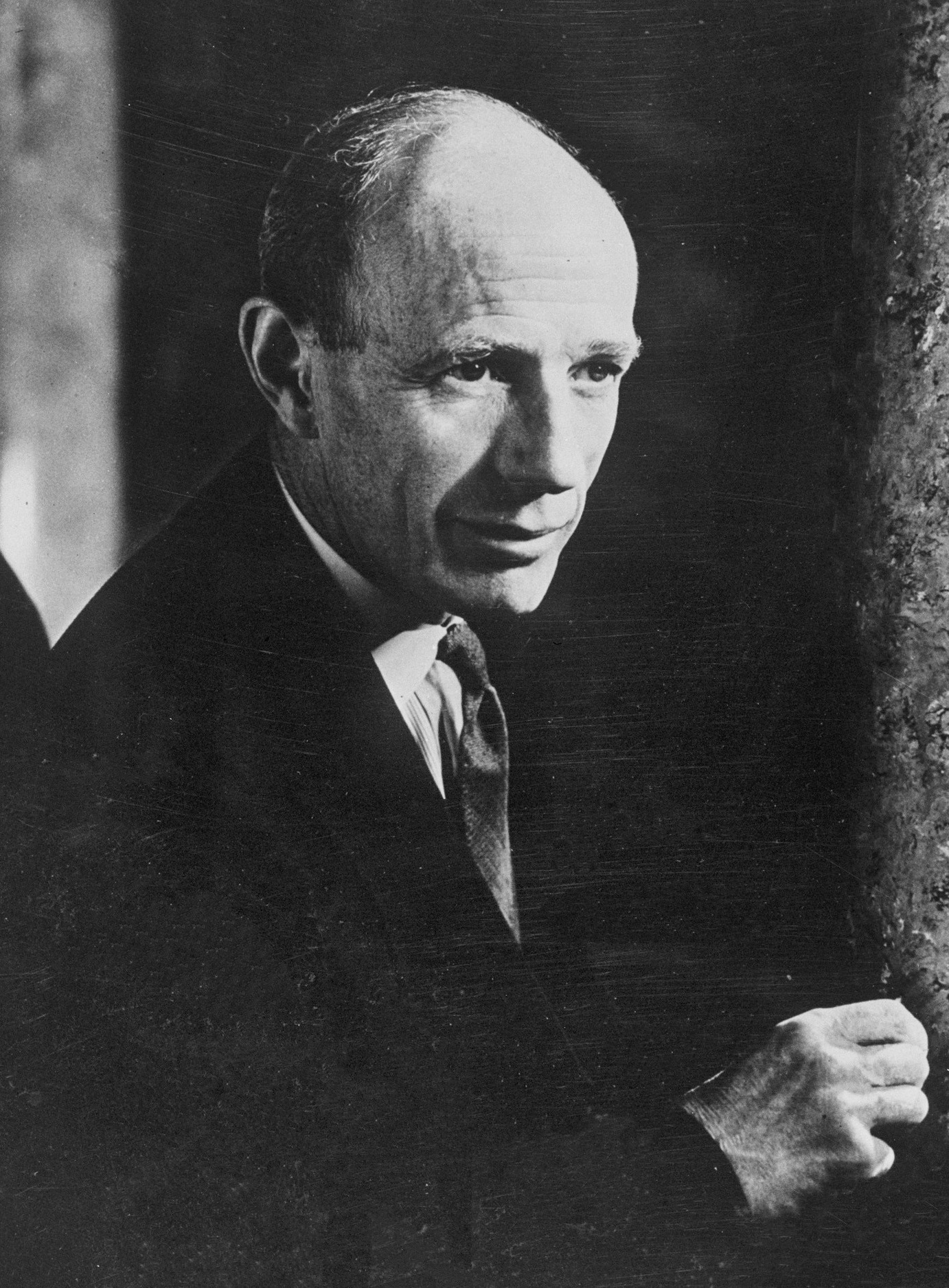
- Halifax in 1944

British Ambassador to the United States
- In office 23 December 1940 – 1 May 1946
- Nominated by: Winston Churchill
- Appointed by: George VI
- Preceded by: Philip Kerr, 11th Marquess of Lothian
- Succeeded by: Archibald Clark Kerr, 1st Baron Inverchapel

Leader of the House of Lords
- In office 3 October 1940 – 22 December 1940
- Prime Minister: Winston Churchill
- Preceded by: The Viscount Caldecote
- Succeeded by: The Lord Lloyd
- In office 22 November 1935 – 21 February 1938
- Prime Minister: Stanley Baldwin; Neville Chamberlain
- Preceded by: The Marquess of Londonderry
- Succeeded by: The Earl Stanhope

Secretary of State for Foreign Affairs
- In office 21 February 1938 – 22 December 1940
- Prime Minister: Neville Chamberlain; Winston Churchill
- Preceded by: Anthony Eden
- Succeeded by: Anthony Eden

Secretary of State for War
- In office 7 June 1935 – 22 November 1935
- Prime Minister: Stanley Baldwin
- Preceded by: The Viscount Hailsham
- Succeeded by: Duff Cooper

Lord President of the Council
- In office 28 May 1937 – 9 March 1938
- Prime Minister: Neville Chamberlain
- Preceded by: Ramsay MacDonald
- Succeeded by: The Viscount Hailsham

Lord Privy Seal
- In office 22 November 1935 – 28 May 1937
- Prime Minister: Stanley Baldwin
- Preceded by: The Marquess of Londonderry
- Succeeded by: The Earl De La Warr

Chancellor of the University of Oxford
- In office 1933–1959
- Preceded by: Edward Grey, 1st Viscount Grey of Fallodon
- Succeeded by: Harold Macmillan

Viceroy and Governor-General of India
- In office 3 April 1926 – 18 April 1931
- Monarch: George V
- Prime Minister: Stanley Baldwin; Ramsay MacDonald
- Preceded by: Rufus Isaacs, 1st Earl of Reading
- Succeeded by: Freeman Freeman-Thomas, 1st Marquess of Willingdon

Minister of Agriculture and Fisheries
- In office 6 November 1924 – 4 November 1925
- Prime Minister: Stanley Baldwin
- Preceded by: Noel Buxton
- Succeeded by: Walter Guinness

President of the Board of Education
- In office 24 October 1922 – 22 January 1924
- Prime Minister: Bonar Law; Stanley Baldwin
- Preceded by: H. A. L. Fisher
- Succeeded by: Charles Trevelyan

Parliamentary Under-Secretary of State for the Colonies
- In office 1 April 1921 – 24 October 1922
- Prime Minister: David Lloyd George
- Preceded by: Leo Amery
- Succeeded by: William Ormsby-Gore

Member of the House of Lords
- Lord Temporal
- as a hereditary peer 5 December 1925 – 23 December 1959
- Preceded by: Created Baron Irwin in 1925 (Note: He inherited his father's titles in 1934.)
- Succeeded by: The 2nd Earl of Halifax

Member of Parliament for Ripon
- In office 10 February 1910 – 5 December 1925
- Preceded by: H. F. B. Lynch
- Succeeded by: John Hills

Personal details
- Born: Edward Frederick Lindley Wood; 16 April 1881 Powderham Castle, Exminster, England
- Died: 23 December 1959 (aged 78) Garrowby, England
- Party: Conservative
- Spouse: Lady Dorothy Onslow (m. 1909)
- Children: 5, including Charles Wood, 2nd Earl of Halifax, and Richard Wood, Baron Holderness
- Parents: Charles Wood, 2nd Viscount Halifax; Lady Agnes Courtenay
- Education: Christ Church, Oxford
- The Earl of Halifax's voice Halifax giving a speech in support of Lend-Lease; Recorded 11 March 1944

Edward Frederick Lindley Wood, 1st Earl of Halifax (16 April 1881 – 23 December 1959), known as the 1st Baron Irwin from 1925 until 1934 and the 3rd Viscount Halifax from 1934 until 1944, was a British Conservative politician. He held several senior ministerial posts during this time, most notably those of Viceroy of India from 1926 to 1931 and of Foreign Secretary between 1938 and 1940. He was one of the architects of the policy of appeasement of Adolf Hitler in 1936–1938, working closely with Prime Minister Neville Chamberlain. After Kristallnacht on 9–10 November 1938 and the German occupation of Czechoslovakia in March 1939, he was one of those who pushed for a new policy of attempting to deter further German aggression by promising to go to war to defend Poland.

Halifax was the leading candidate to succeed Chamberlain as prime minister early in May 1940, but effectively declined the position as he felt he would be little more than a figurehead with Winston Churchill running the war (Halifax's membership in the House of Lords was given as the official reason). A few weeks later, with the Allies nearing catastrophic defeat and British forces falling back to Dunkirk, Halifax favoured approaching Italy to see if acceptable peace terms could be negotiated. He was overruled by Churchill after a series of stormy meetings of the War cabinet. From December 1940 to May 1946, he served as British Ambassador to the United States.

== Early life and education ==
Wood was born on 16 April 1881 at Powderham Castle in Devon at the home of his maternal grandfather, William Courtenay, 11th Earl of Devon. He was born into a Yorkshire family, the sixth child and fourth son of Charles Wood, 2nd Viscount Halifax (1839–1934), and Lady Agnes Elizabeth Courtenay (1838–1919). His father was President of the English Church Union, which pushed for ecumenical reunion, in 1868, 1919, and 1927–1934. His great-grandfather was Charles Grey, 2nd Earl Grey, of tea fame, also the prime minister who introduced the Reform Act 1832.

Between 1886 and 1890, Wood's three older brothers died young, leaving him, at the age of nine, heir to his father's fortune and seat in the House of Lords. He was brought up in a world of religion and hunting. His religiosity as a devout Anglo-Catholic like his father earned him the nickname, possibly coined by Churchill, of the "Holy Fox". He was born with an atrophied left arm and no left hand, which did not stop him from enjoying riding, hunting and shooting. He had an artificial left hand with a spring-operated thumb, with which he could hold reins or open gates.

Wood's childhood was divided mainly between two houses in Yorkshire: Hickleton Hall, near Doncaster, and Garrowby. He attended St David's Prep School in Reigate from September 1892 and Eton College from September 1894. He was not happy at school as he was not talented either at sport or classics. He went up to Christ Church, Oxford, in October 1899. He took no part in student politics but blossomed academically, graduating with a first class degree in Modern History. Whilst at Oxford he was a member of the private all-male dining society the Bullingdon Club, known for its wealthy members, grand banquets, and bad behaviour.

He was on 11 April 1900 commissioned a second lieutenant in the Queen's Own Yorkshire Dragoons, a West Riding volunteer cavalry regiment.

From November 1903 until 1910, he was a Fellow of All Souls College, Oxford. After a year at All Souls, he went on a Grand Tour of South Africa, India, Australia and New Zealand with Ludovic Heathcoat-Amory. In 1905, he returned to England for two years of study at All Souls. He visited Canada in 1907. He wrote a short biography of the Victorian cleric John Keble (1909).

== Early political career and war service ==
Wood had not stood in the 1906 UK general election, at which the Liberals won a landslide victory, choosing to devote his energies to his All Souls Fellowship. By 1909, the political tides had turned enough for Wood to put himself forward for the Conservative candidacy at Ripon in Yorkshire, and he was easily selected through local influence. Ripon had gone Liberal in 1906; Wood won it with a 1,000 vote majority in January 1910 and held it with a reduced majority in December 1910. He remained Member of Parliament for Ripon until his elevation to the Lords in 1925. He was a Ditcher (i.e. opposed to the bitter end and ready to "die in the last ditch" to defend the House of Lords' right to veto legislation) in the disputes over the Parliament Act 1911 but really made little impact on politics before 1914. He was vigorously opposed to Welsh Disestablishment.

Before the First World War, Wood was already a captain in the volunteer regiment Queen's Own Yorkshire Dragoons. He made a rare intervention in debate, urging that conscription be introduced immediately. He was sent to the front line in 1916. In January 1917 he was mentioned in despatches ("Heaven Knows What For" he wrote). He rose to the rank of major. He was then deputy director of Labour Supply at the Ministry of National Service from November 1917 to the end of 1918. He was initially sympathetic to Lord Lansdowne's proposal for a compromise peace, but ultimately demanded all-out victory and a punitive peace.

Wood was unopposed in the UK general elections of 1918, 1922, 1923, and 1924. He was a signatory to the April 1919 Lowther Petition calling for harsher peace terms against Germany in the Treaty of Versailles then being negotiated. In the 1918–1922 Parliament, Wood was an ally of Samuel Hoare, Philip Lloyd-Greame and Walter Elliot, all ambitious younger MPs in favour of progressive reform.

In 1918, Wood and George Lloyd (later Lord Lloyd) wrote "The Great Opportunity", a tract aiming to set an agenda for a revived Conservative and Unionist Party following the end of the Lloyd George coalition. They urged the Conservative Party to concentrate on the welfare of the community rather than the good of the individual. With the Irish War of Independence then in progress Wood urged a federal solution. At this time he concentrated on housing and agriculture and Ireland.

== Early ministerial career ==
In May 1920, Wood accepted the Governor-Generalship of South Africa; the offer was withdrawn after the South African government announced that it wanted a cabinet minister or a member of the royal family. In April 1921, he was appointed Under-Secretary of State for the Colonies, under Churchill who was initially reluctant to meet him (on one occasion he stormed into Churchill's office and told him that he "expected to be treated like a gentleman"). In the winter of 1921–1922, Wood visited the British West Indies and wrote a report for Churchill.

On 16 October 1922, Wood attended the meeting of the junior ministers who expressed disquiet at the Lloyd George Coalition. On 19 October 1922, he voted at the Carlton Club meeting for the Conservatives to fight the next election as an independent force. The Coalition ended and Bonar Law formed a purely Conservative government. Wood was promoted to the Cabinet on 24 October 1922 as President of the Board of Education. Some saw this as an improvement in the moral character of the government. Austerity policies left no room for constructive policies. Wood, who spent two days hunting each week, was neither interested nor particularly effective in the job but saw it as a stepping stone to greater things. He was not happy about Stanley Baldwin's adoption of tariffs in December 1923, which saw the Conservatives lose their majority and give way to a minority Labour government.

When the Conservatives were returned to power on 6 November 1924, Wood was appointed Minister for Agriculture, a more onerous job than Education had been. He took an Agriculture and Tithes Bill through the Commons.

== Viceroy of India ==
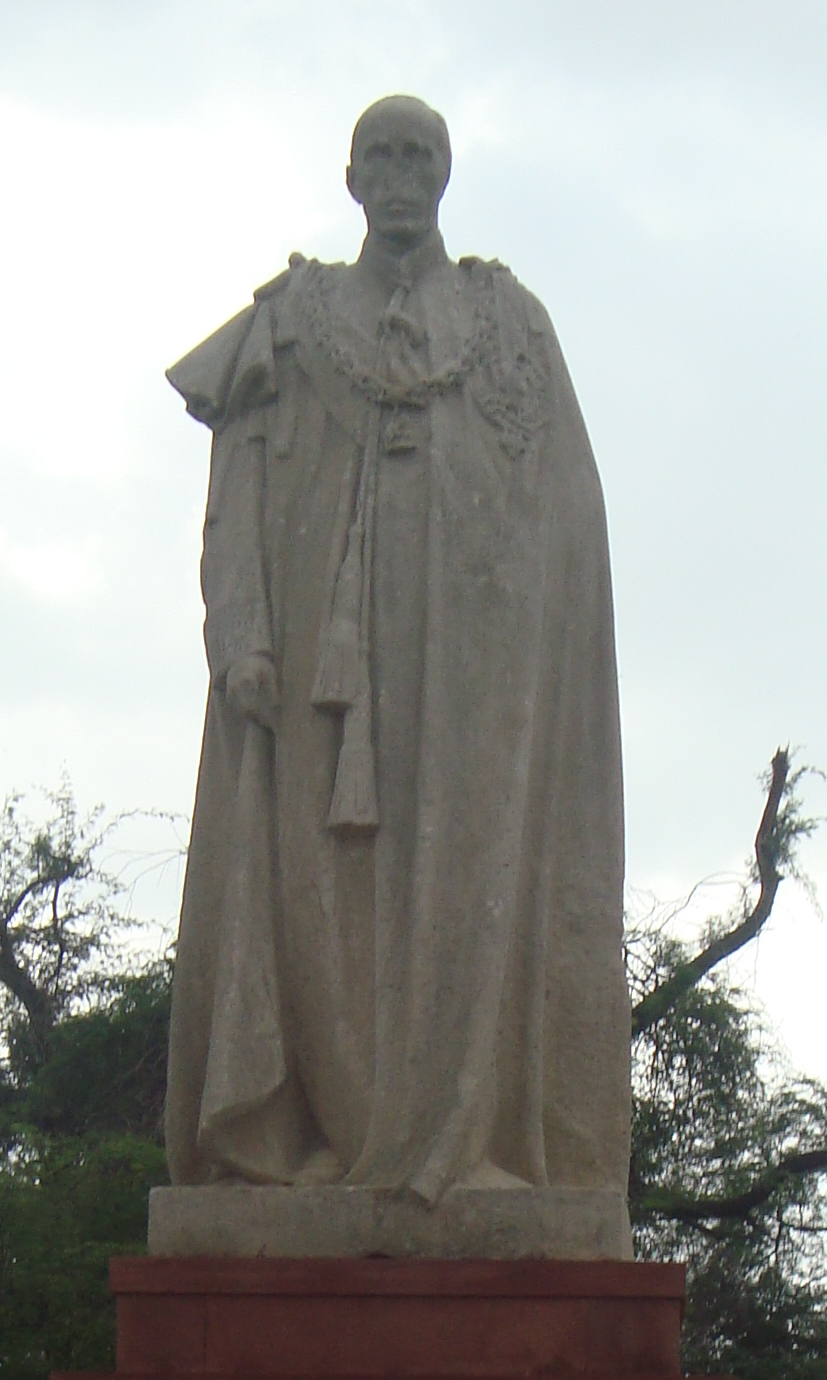
Statue of Lord Irwin at Coronation Park, Delhi

In October 1925, Lord Birkenhead, Secretary of State for India, offered Wood the job of Viceroy of India at the suggestion of King George V. His grandfather Sir Charles Wood had been Secretary of State for India in 1859–1865. He almost declined, as he had two sons of school age and his aged father seemed unlikely to live until 1931 when his term was due to end. He accepted on the advice of his father (who lived to see him return). He was created Baron Irwin, of Kirby Underdale in the County of York, in December 1925. He left for India on 17 March 1926, and arrived in Bombay on 1 April 1926. Irwin was honoured with the GCSI and GCIE in 1926.

Irwin relished the pomp of the viceroyalty. He was an able horseman, and stood 6' 5". He had a "Cecilian stoop and sympathetic kindly eyes" and gave an impression of a Prince of the Church (R. Bernays Naked Fakir 1931). Several attempts were made to assassinate him. He was more sympathetic to Indians than his predecessors had been, although he had no compunctions about signing death warrants when he thought them justified. He wanted Indians to be more united and friendly to the UK; his first major speech as viceroy, and several more throughout his term of office, urged an end to communal violence between Hindus and Muslims.

=== Simon Commission ===
The Government of India Act 1919 had incorporated the Montagu–Chelmsford Reforms ("Diarchy" – shared rule between British and Indians at the local level) and had promised that after ten years there would be a commission to inquire about a new constitution and to advise on whether further reforms were needed. Irwin accepted that greater self-government was necessary, as Indian national aspirations had grown since 1919. Birkenhead brought forward the date of the commission, and put it under Sir John Simon. Irwin recommended an all-British inquiry, as he thought that the Indian factions would not agree among themselves but would fall into line behind the results of the inquiry. David Dutton believes that this was "the most fateful mistake of his viceroyalty, and one he came bitterly to regret".

In November 1927, the composition of the Simon Commission was announced. All the leading Indian parties, including the Indian National Congress, boycotted it. Irwin assured Birkenhead that Simon could win over moderate Indian opinion. Simon arrived in Bombay on 3 February 1928. He achieved some limited successes, but Irwin became convinced that a new gesture would be necessary. Indian responses to Simon's arrival included the All-Parties Conference, a committee of which produced the Nehru Report (May 1928), advocating dominion status for India. However, there was also violence, including the death of Lala Lajpat Rai in November 1928 and the revenge attack of Bhagat Singh in December 1928. Other responses included the Muslim League leader Muhammad Ali Jinnah's 14 points (March 1929).

=== Irwin Declaration ===
In June 1929, a new Labour government took office in the UK, with Ramsay MacDonald Prime Minister for the second time and William Wedgwood Benn as Secretary of State for India. On 13 July 1929, Irwin arrived in England on leave, having chosen Lord Goschen to be his acting viceroy in India. Indeed, on his return to London, Irwin brought with him a "suggested" draft exchange of letters between MacDonald and Simon. His plan was for Simon to write proposing a Round Table Conference to discuss the findings of the commission, and that MacDonald would then reply pointing out that the 1917 Montagu Declaration implied a commitment to Dominion status (i.e. that India should become completely self-governing, like Canada or Australia). Simon saw the drafts and had serious misgivings about the planned Round Table Conference. The exchange of letters did not mention Dominion status as the other commissioners did not favour it, although Simon did not report the depth of their feeling, which he came to share, that such a declaration would undermine the findings of the Commission and that Dominion status would now become a minimum demand for the Indian leaders rather than an ultimate goal. The author David Dutton finds it "curious" that Irwin, who had believed that Simon would not object to Dominion status, did not understand this.

The Irwin Declaration of October 1929 committed Britain to eventual Dominion status for India. Despite such a policy having been implicit for a decade, the Declaration was denounced by many on the Tory Right. Lord Reading (Irwin's predecessor as Viceroy) denounced it, and Simon made his displeasure known. There was brief hope of a breakthrough in Anglo-Indian relations, but the New Delhi Conference of December 1929 between Irwin and the Indian leaders failed to reach agreement. Gandhi now began a campaign of civil disobedience with a view to achieving complete independence. He walked for 24 days to the sea, where he proceeded to make salt, in breach of the government's historic monopoly. Irwin had all the Congress leaders put behind bars, including Gandhi eventually.

Some criticism of Irwin may have been unfair but he had made an error and the consequences were serious and unrest grew. Irwin's position was seen as excessively lenient by London but as half-hearted in India. With little room for manoeuvre, Irwin resorted to repression using his emergency powers to ban public gatherings and crush rebellious opposition. Gandhi's detention, however, only made matters worse.

=== Agreement with Mahatma Gandhi ===
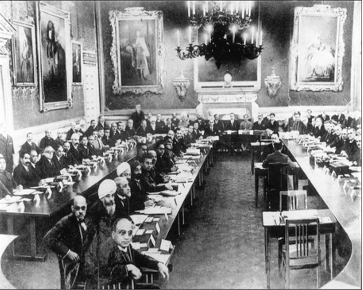
The First Round Table Conference in London, 12 November 1930

In November 1930, King George V opened the First Round Table Conference in London; no Congress delegates took part because Gandhi was in jail. In January 1931, Gandhi was released and at Irwin's invitation they had eight meetings together. Irwin wrote to his aged father that "it was rather like talking to someone who had stepped off another planet onto this for a short visit of a fortnight and whose mental outlook was quite other to that which was regulating most of the affairs on the planet to which he had descended". But they had mutual respect based on their respective religious faiths.

The fortnight-long discussions resulted in the Gandhi–Irwin Pact of 5 March 1931, after which the Civil Disobedience Movement and the boycott of British goods were suspended in exchange for a Second Round Table Conference that represented all interests. The salient points were:

- The Congress would discontinue the Civil Disobedience Movement.
- The Congress would participate in the Round Table Conference.
- The Government would withdraw all ordinances issued to curb the Congress.
- The Government would withdraw all prosecutions relating to offences not involving violence.
- The Government would release all persons serving sentences of imprisonment for their activities in the civil disobedience movement.

It was further agreed that Gandhi would join the Second Round Table Conference as the sole representative of the Congress. On 20 March 1931, Irwin paid tribute to Gandhi's honesty, sincerity and patriotism at a dinner given by ruling princes. On the evening of 23 March 1931, after a trial now widely viewed to have been unlawful and unfair, the Indian revolutionaries Bhagat Singh, Shivaram Rajguru and Sukhdev Thapar were hanged, in an execution brought forward by 12 hours. The exact extent of political interference is yet to be brought to light.

== British politics 1931–1935 ==
Irwin returned to the UK on 3 May 1931. He was honoured with the Order of the Garter (he became chancellor of the order in 1943). In 1931 he declined the Foreign Office in the new National Government, not least because the Tory Right would not have liked it. Officially, he declared that he wanted to spend time at home. He went to Canada, at the invitation of Vincent Massey, to speak at the University of Toronto. He was still a firm protégé of Stanley Baldwin. In June 1932, on the sudden death of Sir Donald Maclean, he returned to the Cabinet as President of the Board of Education, for the second time, having been apparently genuinely reluctant to accept. His views were somewhat old-fashioned: he declared: "We want a school to train them up to be servants and butlers."

Irwin became Master of the Middleton Hunt in 1932 and was elected as Chancellor of Oxford University in 1933. In 1934 he inherited the title Viscount Halifax on the death of his 94-year-old father. He helped Samuel Hoare draft what became the Government of India Act 1935, the largest single piece of legislation of the 1931–1935 government. In June 1935, Baldwin became prime minister for the third time, and Halifax was appointed Secretary of State for War. He was pleased to give up the Education job. He felt the country was unprepared for war, but he resisted the Chiefs of Staffs' demands for rearmament. In November 1935, after the general election, Halifax became Lord Privy Seal and Leader of the House of Lords.

== Foreign policy ==
=== Colleague of Eden ===
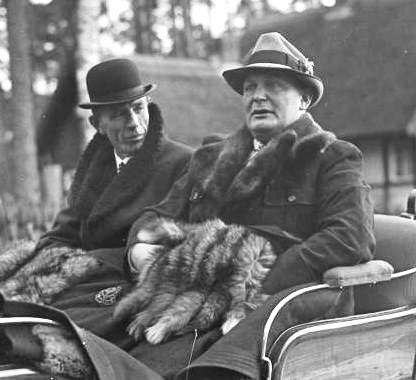
Lord Halifax with Hermann Göring at Schorfheide, Germany, 20 November 1937

By this time, Halifax was becoming increasingly influential in foreign affairs. Cabinet met on the morning of 18 December 1935 to discuss the public outcry over the Hoare–Laval Pact. Halifax, who was due to make a statement in the Lords that afternoon, insisted that the Foreign Secretary Samuel Hoare must resign to save the government's position, causing J. H. Thomas, William Ormsby-Gore and Walter Elliott also to come out for his resignation. Anthony Eden was appointed Foreign Secretary in Hoare's place. The following year, Halifax said the provisions of the Pact "were not so frightfully different from those put forward by the Committee of Five [of the League]. But the latter were of respectable parentage: and the Paris ones were too much like the off-the-stage arrangements of nineteenth-century diplomacy". Effectively, although not formally, Halifax was deputy Foreign Secretary to Eden. Halifax was one of the signatories to the Anglo-Egyptian Treaty of 1936. In general they got on well.

Halifax and Eden were in agreement about the direction of foreign policy (and in line with prevailing opinion throughout Britain) that Nazi Germany's remilitarization of the Rhineland, its "own backyard", would be difficult to oppose and should be welcomed insofar as it continued Germany's seeming progress towards normality after the tribulations of the post-First World War settlement. In 1936, Neville Chamberlain recorded that Halifax was always saying he wanted to retire from public life. In May 1937, when Neville Chamberlain succeeded Baldwin as prime minister, Halifax became Lord President of the Council, as well as remaining Leader of the House of Lords. Chamberlain began increasingly to intervene directly in foreign policy, activity for which his background had not prepared him, and which caused increasing tension with Eden.

In November 1937, Halifax visited Germany in a semi-official capacity, and met Adolf Hitler. The visit came about after Hermann Göring invited Halifax, in his private capacity as Master of the Middleton Hunt, to attend a hunting exhibition in Berlin, and to hunt foxes with Göring in Pomerania. Halifax later stated that he had initially been unenthusiastic about the circumstances of the visit, although Eden had pressed him to accept the invitation, and Halifax's trip to Germany had not been an attempt by Chamberlain to bypass the Foreign Office. In Germany, Göring gave Halifax the nickname "Halalifax" – after a German hunting call, Halali!. At Berchtesgaden, there was a long and tense meeting with Hitler, whom he initially mistook for a footman. In these discussions, Halifax spoke of "possible alterations to the European order which might be destined to come about with the passage of time". Ignoring Eden's reservations, he did not object in principle to Hitler's designs on Austria, and parts of Czechoslovakia and Poland, although he stressed that only peaceful processes of change would be acceptable. Halifax was generally regarded publicly at the time as acting on behalf of the British government, and attempting to renew dialogue with the German government.

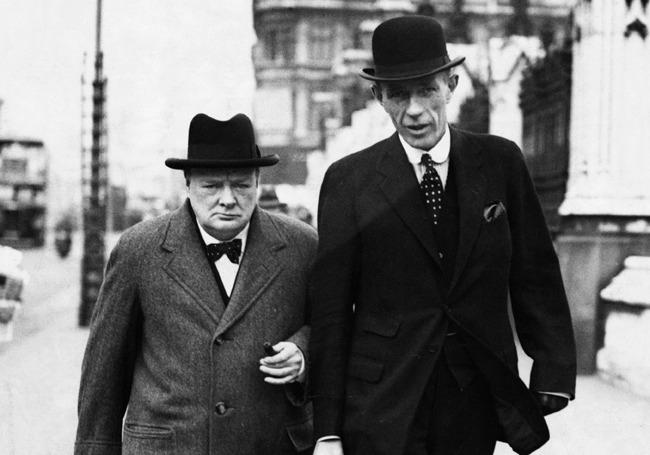
Halifax and Winston Churchill in 1938. Note Halifax's artificial left hand, concealed under a black glove.

Writing to Baldwin on the subject of the conversation between Carl Jacob Burckhardt (the League of Nations' Commissioner of Danzig) and Hitler, Halifax said: "Nationalism and Racialism is a powerful force but I can't feel that it's either unnatural or immoral! I cannot myself doubt that these fellows are genuine haters of Communism, etc.! And I daresay if we were in their position we might feel the same!"

In December 1937, Halifax told the Cabinet that "we ought to get on good terms with Germany", as despite the best efforts of Eden and Chamberlain, Britain was still faced with the prospect of war with Germany, Italy and Japan. By February 1938, Halifax warned Chamberlain of strains in the Cabinet, and tried to broker a deal between Chamberlain and Eden. Eden resigned as Foreign Secretary on 20 February, in protest at Chamberlain's wish to make further concessions to Benito Mussolini, whom Eden regarded as an untrustworthy gangster, without gestures of good faith on his part. Halifax was appointed Foreign Secretary on 21 February 1938, despite some criticism from Labour and elsewhere that so important a job was being given to a peer. Halifax commented "I have had enough obloquy for one lifetime" (i.e. as viceroy of India) before accepting appointment as Foreign Secretary. Chamberlain preferred him to the excitable Eden: "I thank God for a steady unruffled Foreign Secretary."

=== Foreign Secretary ===
==== Analysis ====
Halifax's political line as Foreign Secretary must be seen in the context of existing British foreign policy, which was predicated on a broad consensus that in none of the democracies was there popular support for war, military pressure, or even rearmament. There was debate about the extent to which the dictatorships' very separate interests could be teased apart. It was clear that an alignment of Germany and Italy would divide Britain's forces in any general war and that, without at least a neutral Italy, Britain would be unable to move large naval forces east to confront Japan, given strong isolationist sentiment in America. For many, especially in the Foreign Office, appeasement was a necessary compromise to buy time for rearmament, a process to which Britain was already heavily committed. Others, especially Churchill, hoped that a strong military alliance with France would permit a more robust foreign policy towards the dictators. Many shared Churchill's confidence in the large French Army, although fewer shared his belief that France would be a resilient ally.

Chamberlain embraced the policy of appeasement as a moral force for good, as did many others who were deeply opposed to war and defence spending. By comparison, Halifax's policy appears more pragmatic, like that of Samuel Hoare, coupled to a firm commitment to rearmament, albeit unenthusiastically. All parties recognised the hostility of public opinion to war or military preparations, and the difficulty of acting without a readiness on the part of America or the Soviet Union to play their part (the Labour Party opposed rearmament until well after the Munich Agreement). Nonetheless, Halifax was criticised as an appeaser, along with Chamberlain, Hoare, and twelve others, in the anonymous 1940 book Guilty Men.

==== Munich ====
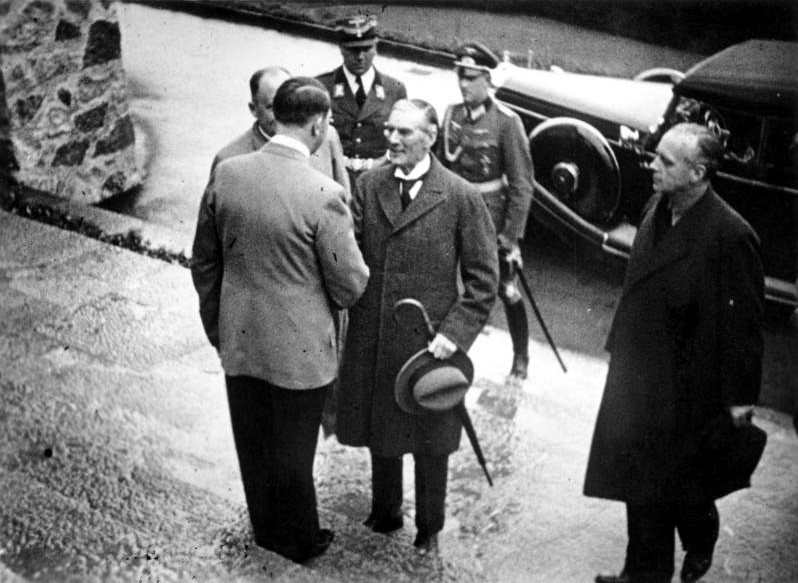
Adolf Hitler greets British Prime Minister Neville Chamberlain on the steps of the Berghof, 15 September 1938 during the crisis over Czechoslovakia. Joachim von Ribbentrop stands on the right.

Hitler's annexation of Austria in March 1938 made Halifax keener on British rearmament. Czechoslovakia was clearly next on the agenda, but neither Britain nor France believed they had the military capacity to support her, and in the summer of 1938, Halifax still wanted to urge the Czechoslovaks in private to make concessions to Germany, which was making demands regarding the status of the Sudeten Germans. Halifax remained in London and did not accompany Chamberlain on his dramatic flights to Germany in the autumn of 1938. This was once seen as a sign of Chamberlain's dominance of his Cabinet.

It appears that a frank conversation with his pugnacious Permanent Secretary, Sir Alexander Cadogan, brought Halifax to the sharp realisation that the road to appeasement had taken Britain into a series of concessions that were unwise and that were unlikely to secure the necessary pacification of Germany. On 25 September 1938, Halifax spoke out in Cabinet against the inflated demands presented by Hitler in the Godesberg Memorandum after his second summit meeting with Chamberlain. It is now known that Halifax, under Cadogan's influence, persuaded the Cabinet to reject the Godesberg terms. Britain and Germany came close to war until Chamberlain flew to Munich. Chamberlain could hardly afford to lose a second Foreign Secretary, and his dominance of his Cabinet was never so overwhelming again.

The eventual Munich Agreement, signed after Chamberlain's third summit meeting with Hitler, was apparently popular around the world and humiliating to many in the British government, but it was short of Hitler's desires (and of Chamberlain's proposed concessions) and increased Hitler's determination to return to destroy Czechoslovakia in the spring. On 3 October 1938, Halifax defended the Munich Agreement in the House of Lords, in much more measured terms than the Prime Minister had done, not as a triumph but as the lesser of two evils.

The Munich crisis had seen Halifax begin to take a stronger line than Chamberlain against further concessions to Germany. Andrew Roberts argues that from this point on, Halifax set his face firmly towards a policy of deterrence. He hoped that increased rearmament—including strengthening of alliances with and economic support to the countries of Eastern Europe, and the reintroduction of conscription—coupled with a firmer line towards Germany, Italy, and Japan would reduce the risks of those three hostile powers acting in combination. It is of note that, when war began, neither Japan nor Italy was prepared to join in until the pendulum had swung much further in Germany's favour.

==== After Munich ====
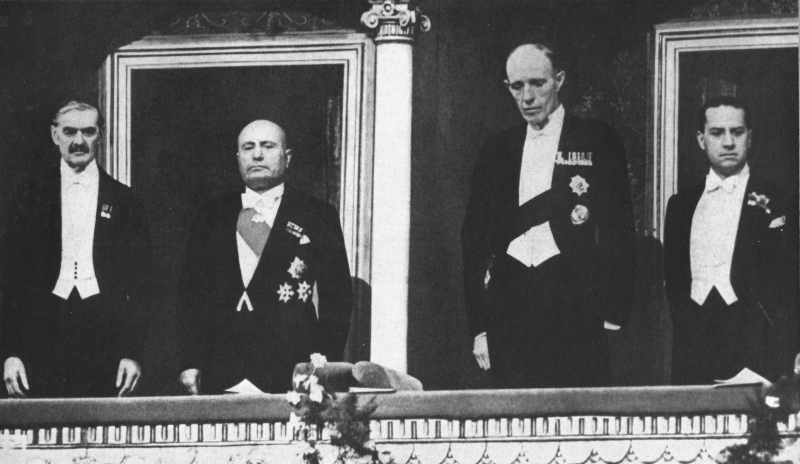
Neville Chamberlain, Benito Mussolini, Halifax, and Count Ciano at the Opera of Rome, January 1939

After Munich, Halifax (successfully) advised Chamberlain against capitalising on his popularity by calling a snap general election; instead, he urged (in vain) for Chamberlain to widen the National Coalition by offering jobs not just to Churchill and Eden but also to Labour and Liberal figures. Halifax was also disgusted by the anti-Jewish pogrom of Kristallnacht (10 November). He advocated British financial aid to the countries of Central and Eastern Europe to discourage them from coming under Germany's influence. With Hitler's lack of commitment regarding the Munich Agreement becoming clearer, Halifax worked steadily to assemble a stronger British position by pushing Chamberlain to take economic steps to underpin British interests in Eastern Europe and prevent additional military supplies from reaching Germany, such as tungsten. In January 1939, Halifax accompanied Chamberlain to Rome for talks with Mussolini. That month Halifax pushed for staff talks with France, in view of the danger of war with both Germany and Italy simultaneously. After Hitler broke the Munich agreement and occupied the rump of "Czecho-slovakia" (the hyphen had been added after Munich), Chamberlain gave a speech in Birmingham on 17 March 1939, pledging that Britain would go to war to defend Poland. Halifax had been one of the drivers in this change of policy. By March 1939, Eden, then out of office, observed that thanks to Halifax the government are "now doing what we would wish".

Halifax granted a guarantee to Poland on 31 March 1939, triggered by alarming intelligence of German preparations, in hopes of sending clear signals to Germany that, in Halifax's words, there would be "no more Munichs". The Foreign Office received intelligence in early April 1939 that Italy was about to invade Albania. At a Cabinet meeting on 5 April 1939, Halifax rejected these reports. Two days later, Italy invaded Albania; Halifax met Sir Alexander Cadogan and "decided we can't do anything to stop it". Although he disliked the Soviet regime, not least because of its atheism, Halifax was quicker than Chamberlain to realise that Britain should attempt to ally with the Soviets. He told the Foreign Affairs committee: "Soviet Russia is something between that of the unconquerable steamroller and looking on her as entirely useless militarily. We cannot ignore a country with a population of 180,000,000 people."

The negotiations (in summer 1939) failed, and the Soviets signed an agreement with the Germans instead on 23 August. It has been suggested that Halifax should have led the negotiations himself, but that would not have suited Halifax's purpose because his government had not carried out the negotiations in good faith. The Foreign Office confirmed to the US chargé d'affaires on 8 August 1939 that "the military mission, which had now left Moscow, had been told to make every effort to prolong discussions until 1 October 1939". Halifax disclosed to the Foreign Affairs Committee on 10 July 1939: "Although the French were in favour of the military conversations commencing, the French Government thought that the military conversations would be spun out over a long time and as long as they were taking place we should be preventing Soviet Russia from entering the German camp."

While Henry Roberts has spoken of Halifax's fellow Foreign Minister (of the Soviet Union), Maxim Litvinov, as having acute perceptive skills and an ability "to detect major trends in the 1930s and to anticipate the course of events indicates his tremendous understanding of the decade", Halifax had completely misunderstood Hitler. Halifax said: "Hitler had a very low opinion of the Soviet Union, and our action [in aligning with the Soviets] would confirm to him the idea that we were a weak and feeble folk". On the contrary, what made Hitler worried was the thought of a joint pact between France, Britain and the Soviet Union to prevent a pact between Germany and the Soviet Union. Halifax did not know that in April 1939, Hitler told Ernst von Weizsäcker that he was contemplating a reconciliation with the Soviet Union. On 2 August 1939, Hitler asked Konstantin von Neurath, a former Foreign Minister and career diplomat during the Weimar Republic, whether the German people would accept such an ideological shift from anti-communism to signing a pact with the Soviet Union. Neurath assured Hitler that he "could do what he liked with the [National Socialist] Party".

With Poland now looking likely to be carved up between Germany and the Soviets (as indeed soon took place), the diarist "Chips" Channon, Parliamentary Private Secretary to Halifax's junior minister Rab Butler, who opposed the guarantee, recorded (25 August 1939) that "the barometer of war kept shifting" and that "the Polish guarantee was [Halifax]'s pet scheme and favourite god-child". When Germany invaded Poland, Halifax refused any negotiations while German troops remained on Polish soil. However, he stood solid with Chamberlain, who delayed in giving a commitment to go to war until the French had also committed. Both of them were the objects of a Cabinet revolt, which insisted on Britain honouring the guarantee to Poland. Britain declared war on Germany on 3 September 1939.

=== Phoney War ===
After the outbreak of war, Halifax's diplomacy aimed to dissuade the Soviets from formally joining the Axis powers. He opposed the bombing of Germany, lest the Germans retaliate. Swedish intermediary Birger Dahlerus had approached Britain for peace talks in August 1939, just before the outbreak of war. On 1 November 1939, Halifax replied to an approach through Swedish channels that no peace was possible with Hitler in power. Even that aroused the wrath of Churchill, First Lord of the Admiralty, who sent a private note to Halifax rebuking him that such talk was dangerous. Halifax remained opposed to any hint of a compromise peace during the Phoney War.

=== Churchill as Prime Minister ===
On 8 May 1940, Chamberlain's government survived a motion of no confidence brought about by the deteriorating military situation in Norway. The government had a nominal majority of 213 in the House: at the end of the "Norway Debate", they won the vote with a majority of only 81; 33 Conservatives and 8 of their allies voted with the opposition parties, and 60 abstained. Churchill had only grudgingly been appointed First Lord of the Admiralty. Nevertheless, he mounted a strong and passionate defence of Chamberlain and his government in the debate preceding the vote. Under ordinary circumstances, such a weak vote would not have been politically disastrous, but it was decisive at a time when the Prime Minister was being strongly criticised by both sides of the House and there was a strong desire for national unity. Talking to Churchill after the vote, Chamberlain admitted his dismay and said that he would try for a coalition government with the Labour and Liberal parties, but Churchill opposed that.

At 10.15 am the next morning (9 May), Chamberlain met with Halifax and Churchill in the Cabinet Room. Churchill's own account of these events, published eight years later in The Gathering Storm, the first volume of his The Second World War, does not tally exactly with contemporary accounts such as Halifax's own diary and Alexander Cadogan's record of his conversations with Halifax, or accounts given by Chamberlain or by the Chief Whip David Margesson (whose presence at the meeting Churchill does not mention). Churchill described a battle of wills in which Chamberlain opened the meeting by arguing that Churchill could not command the support of the Labour Party after he had had to defend the government at the Norway Debate, only to be met with a lengthy silence before Halifax, with some hesitation, expressed his own unfitness for the job. Other accounts describe Halifax demurring much more rapidly, and Churchill actively agreeing with him. Churchill also misdates the events of 9 May to the following day, and although his writing assistant William Deakin accepted responsibility for this error he later confirmed, in an interview in 1989, that Churchill's account was embellished after numerous retellings and was not meant to be taken seriously. The description of Chamberlain attempting to persuade Churchill to agree tacitly to Halifax's appointment as prime minister is also hard to reconcile with Halifax's having expressed his reluctance to do so to Chamberlain at a meeting between the two men on the morning of the 9th.

At 4.30 pm that afternoon Chamberlain held another meeting, attended by Halifax, Churchill, and the leader and the deputy leader of the opposition Labour Party (Clement Attlee and Arthur Greenwood respectively). He asked the Labour leaders if they would agree to serve in a coalition government. They replied that it might be possible but only with a different prime minister and that before they could give an official answer, they would need the approval of Labour's National Executive Committee, then in Bournemouth preparing for the annual conference which was to start on the Monday. They were asked to telephone with the result of the consultation by the following afternoon. In his diary entry for 9 May, written up the following morning, Halifax later wrote:

I had no doubt at all in my own mind that for me to succeed him would create a quite impossible situation. Apart altogether from Churchill's qualities as compared with my own at this particular juncture, what would in fact be my position? Churchill would be running Defence, and in this connexion one could not but remember the relationship between Asquith and Lloyd George had broken down in the first war... I should speedily become a more or less honorary Prime Minister, living in a kind of twilight just outside the things that really mattered.

The Labour leaders telephoned at 5 pm on the 10th to report that the party would take part in a coalition government, although it had to be under the leadership of someone other than Chamberlain. Accordingly, Chamberlain went to Buckingham Palace to tender his resignation, recommending that George VI ask Churchill to form a government. On doing so, one of Churchill's first actions was to form a new, smaller War cabinet by replacing six of the Conservative politicians with Greenwood and Attlee, retaining only Halifax and Chamberlain.

Churchill's political position was weak, although he was popular with the Labour and Liberal parties for his stance against appeasement in the 1930s. He was unpopular in the Conservative Party, however, and he might not have been the choice of the King. Halifax had the support of most of the Conservative Party and of the King and was acceptable to the Labour Party. His position as a peer was a merely technical barrier given the scale of the crisis, and Churchill reportedly was willing to serve under Halifax. As Lord Beaverbrook said, "Chamberlain wanted Halifax. Labour wanted Halifax. Sinclair wanted Halifax. The Lords wanted Halifax. The King wanted Halifax. And Halifax wanted Halifax." Only the last sentence was incorrect, however; Halifax did not want to become prime minister. He believed that Churchill's energy and leadership skills were superior to his own.

Unlike Simon, Hoare and Chamberlain, Halifax was not the object of Labour hatred in May 1940. Dutton argues that he "drew back" because of "inner self-doubt". "Political ambition had never been the most compelling motivation". He had a stomach ache, possibly psychosomatic, at the thought of becoming prime minister, and also probably thought that he could wield more influence as Churchill's deputy. Like Chamberlain, he served in Churchill's cabinet but was frequently exasperated by Churchill's style of doing business. Like many others, Halifax had serious doubts about Churchill's judgement.

=== May 1940 war cabinet crisis ===
Germany invaded Belgium, the Netherlands, and France on 10 May 1940, the day that Churchill became prime minister. On 22–23 May, the German army reached the English Channel, isolating the British Expeditionary Force at Dunkirk. Churchill soon had a confrontation with Halifax who believed that the United Kingdom should try to negotiate a peace settlement with Hitler, using Mussolini as an intermediary. Halifax believed it better to try to get terms "safeguarding the independence of our Empire, and if possible that of France", in the belief that peace talks would make it easier to get the BEF (British Expeditionary Force) home. He did not believe that there was any realistic chance of defeating Germany. Churchill disagreed, believing that "nations which went down fighting rose again, but those which surrendered tamely were finished" and that Hitler was unlikely to honour any agreement. Moreover, he believed that this was the view of the British people.

On 24 May, Hitler ordered his armies to halt before they reached Dunkirk, and two days later, the British and French navies began to evacuate the Allied forces. Between 25 and 28 May, Churchill and Halifax each fought to bring the War Cabinet around to their own respective points of view; by 28 May, it seemed as if Halifax had the upper hand and that Churchill might be forced from office. Halifax came close to resignation, which might have brought down Churchill's government. Churchill outmanoeuvred Halifax by calling a meeting of his 25-member Outer Cabinet, to whom he delivered a passionate speech, saying, "If this long island story of ours is to end at last, let it end only when each one of us lies choking in his own blood upon the ground", convincing all who were present that Britain must fight on against Hitler whatever the cost. Churchill also obtained the backing of Neville Chamberlain, who was still Conservative Party leader.

Churchill told the War Cabinet that there would be no negotiated peace. Halifax had lost. A few weeks later, in July 1940, Halifax rejected German peace offers presented through the Papal Nuncio in Berne and the Portuguese and Finnish prime ministers. Halifax wrote in his memoirs of an occasion during a short holiday in Yorkshire:

One such interlude early in June 1940 is for ever graven into my memory. It was just after the fall of France, an event which at the time it happened seemed something unbelievable as to be almost surely unreal, and if not unreal then quite immeasurably catastrophic. Dorothy and I had spent a lovely summer evening walking over the Wolds, and on our way home sat in the sun for half an hour at a point looking across the plain of York. All the landscape of the nearer foreground was familiar—its sights, its sounds, its smells; hardly a field that did not call up some half-forgotten bit of association; the red-roofed village and nearby hamlets, gathered as it were for company round the old greystone church, where men and women like ourselves, now long dead and gone, had once knelt in worship and prayer. Here in Yorkshire was a true fragment of the undying England, like the White Cliffs of Dover, or any other part of our land that Englishmen have loved. Then the question came, is it possible that the Prussian jackboot will force its way into this countryside to tread and trample over it at will? The very thought seemed an insult and an outrage; much as if anyone were to be condemned to watch his mother, wife or daughter being raped.

== Ambassador to the United States ==
When Chamberlain retired from the Cabinet due to ill health, Churchill tried to ease Halifax out of the Foreign Office by offering him a job as de facto Deputy Prime Minister, living at 11 Downing Street. Halifax refused, although he agreed to become Leader of the Lords once again. In December 1940, the Marquess of Lothian, British Ambassador to the United States, died suddenly. Halifax was told to take the job by Churchill, with the proviso that he could still attend meetings of the War Cabinet when he was home on leave in London. Churchill's secretary Jock Colville recorded on 20 December that Churchill thought the Washington job was a great opportunity for Halifax to help bring the United States into the war. Colville recorded Churchill's view that Halifax "would never live down the reputation for appeasement which he and the F.O. had won themselves here. He had no future in this country." Colville thought Churchill had been influenced by the monthly censorship reports, which showed that Halifax had inherited some of Chamberlain's unpopularity. Halifax was the last man linked with appeasement to leave the Cabinet, as Chamberlain had by then died, and both Hoare and Simon had already moved to other jobs. Halifax and his wife desperately tried to persuade Anthony Eden to take the Washington job instead, but to no avail. Eden was restored to the Foreign Office in Halifax's place.

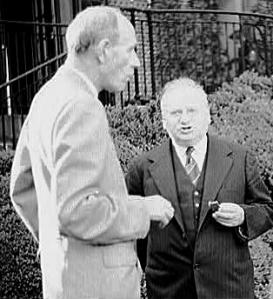
Halifax and Soviet ambassador Maxim Litvinov at a garden party in Washington, D.C., in 1942

Halifax set sail for the still neutral United States in January 1941. President Franklin D. Roosevelt welcomed him in person when he arrived. Casting aside diplomatic protocols, Roosevelt took the presidential yacht the Potomac to greet Halifax as his ship made harbour in the Chesapeake Bay. Initially Halifax damaged himself by a series of public relations disasters. Two weeks after his arrival in the United States, Halifax went to Capitol Hill, meeting with House and Senate leaders. Upon leaving, Halifax told reporters that he had inquired about the timetable for passage of the Lend-Lease Act. Isolationists seized upon the meetings to decry British meddling in American political affairs. He likened Washington politics to "a disorderly day's rabbit shooting".

Halifax was initially a cautious and elusive public figure, not an effective public diplomat like his predecessor. His relations with Roosevelt were satisfactory, but Halifax kept a low profile. Churchill's close engagement with the United States and his investment in personal communication with the President meant a more constrained role for the British Ambassador. Communications technology meant that Churchill could communicate directly with Roosevelt from London; the Prime Minister was also a regular visitor to Washington, enabled by more advanced transportation technology (including both faster ships and aeroplanes). Halifax's cousin Angus McDonnell helped him find his feet, and he soon led a very effective propaganda effort. Even an incident that autumn where he was pelted with rotten eggs and tomatoes by isolationists helped his reputation in the long run. He maintained good relations with Roosevelt and Harry Hopkins, and toured the country, meeting many more ordinary Americans than his predecessor had done. He became especially popular after Pearl Harbor.

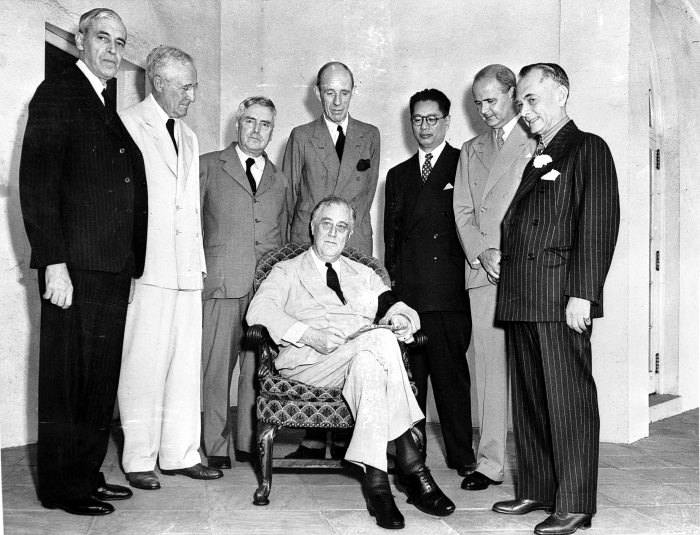
Lord Halifax in the middle (behind a seated Franklin D. Roosevelt) as a member of the Pacific War Council

Relations also increasingly turned on military issues channelled through the Joint Chiefs of Staff secretariat in Washington. Halifax wearied of Washington, especially after the death in action of his middle son Peter in November 1942, and the serious wounding of his younger son Richard in January 1943. In March 1943 he vainly asked Eden to be relieved of his post, but had to stay. In May 1944, Wood was created Earl of Halifax, the fourth creation of the title. Halifax took part in a plethora of international conferences over the UN and the Soviet Union. With Labour in power under Clement Attlee from July 1945, Halifax agreed to Foreign Secretary Ernest Bevin's request to stay on until May 1946. In February 1946, he was present at Churchill's "Iron Curtain" speech at Fulton, Missouri, of which he did not entirely approve. He believed that Churchill's view of the Soviet threat was exaggerated and urged him to be more conciliatory. He also helped John Maynard Keynes negotiate the Anglo-American loan, which was finalised in July 1946.

The final year of his Ambassadorship also witnessed the transition to President Harry S. Truman. Those years contained fraught moments and challenges for the relationship, as American power eclipsed that of Britain, and Britain's interests and rights were ignored on occasion, in particular, the cessation of nuclear co-operation after construction of the atom bomb. However, the partnership in World War II was immensely successful and as close as any other such partnership. It was a demanding post by any standards, but Halifax could reasonably claim to have played his part, and he enjoyed a notably longer term than his less successful successor Archibald Clark Kerr, 1st Baron Inverchapel.

== Later life ==
Back in the United Kingdom, Halifax refused to rejoin the Conservative front bench, arguing that it would be inappropriate as he had been working for the Labour Government then still in office. The Labour Government were proposing that India become fully independent by May 1948 (later brought forward to August 1947). Viscount Templewood (as Samuel Hoare was now known) opposed the plan, but Halifax spoke in the government's favour, arguing that it was not appropriate to oppose the plan if no alternative was suggested. He persuaded many wavering peers to support the government.

In retirement, Halifax returned to largely honorary pursuits. He was Chancellor of the Order of the Garter. He was an active governor of Eton and Chancellor of Oxford University. He was an honorary Fellow of All Souls from 1934. He was Chancellor of the University of Sheffield and High Steward of Westminster Abbey. He was Master of the Middleton Hunt. He was President of the Pilgrims Society, a society dedicated to better Anglo-American relations. From 1947 he was chairman of the General Advisory Council of the BBC. From 1957 he was Grand Master of the Order of Saint Michael and Saint George.

By the mid-1950s, his health was failing. One of his last major speeches in the House of Lords was in November 1956, when he criticised the government's Suez policy and the damage it was doing to Anglo-American relations. He did little to challenge the critical view of appeasement which was then fashionable. His 1957 autobiography Fulness of Days was described in the Dictionary of National Biography as "gently evasive". David Dutton describes it as "an extremely reticent book which added little to the historical record". He gave the impression that he had been Chamberlain's faithful subordinate, omitting to mention his role in changing policy in spring 1939.

He died of a heart attack at his estate at Garrowby on 23 December 1959, aged 78. His widow survived him until 1976.

Halifax had sold Temple Newsam to the City of Leeds for less than market value in 1925, although a similar offer for its contents was declined by the council. In 1948 he donated 164 of his paintings to a museum being opened there by Leeds City Council. His will was valued for probate at £338,800 10s 8d (not including settled land – land tied up in family trusts so that no individual has full control over it), equivalent to around £9.2 million in 2024. Despite his great wealth, Halifax was notoriously mean with money. Rab Butler recounted a tale of how he had once been having a meeting with Halifax, his boss at the time. An official brought in two cups of tea and four biscuits for them; Halifax passed two of the biscuits back, instructing the official not to charge him for them.

== Assessments ==
Halifax could not pronounce his "r"s. He had professional charm and the natural authority of an aristocrat, the latter aided by his immense height, as he stood 1.96 metres (6 ft 5 in). Harold Begbie described Halifax as "the highest kind of Englishman now in politics" whose "life and doctrine were in complete harmony with a very lofty moral principle, but who has no harsh judgement for men who err and go astray." Harold Macmillan said that Halifax possessed a "sweet and Christian nature". Rab Butler called him "this strange and imposing figure—half unworldly saint, half cunning politician."

In 1968, the official records were released of Halifax's years as Foreign Secretary (the "fifty-year rule" was replaced by the "thirty-year rule"). Conservative historian Maurice Cowling argued that Halifax's stance of increasing resistance to Hitler, especially the Polish guarantee in the spring of 1939, was motivated not so much by considerations of strategy but by a need to keep ahead of a sea-change in British domestic opinion. He wrote in 1975: "To history, until yesterday, Halifax was the arch-appeaser. This, it is now recognised, was a mistake. His role, however, was complicated. In these pages he is not the man who stopped the rot, but the embodiment of Conservative wisdom who decided that Hitler must be obstructed because Labour could not otherwise be resisted."

David Dutton argues that Halifax, like Chamberlain, was slow to appreciate the sheer evil of Hitler and was overly confident that negotiation could yield results. His period as Foreign Secretary was "the pivot of his career and it remains the period upon which his historical reputation ultimately depends"; just as Eden saved his reputation by resigning in time, so Halifax damaged his by being Foreign Secretary in 1938–40. "He deserves some credit for abandoning, or at least for decisively modifying, the policy of appeasement". His refusal to seize the premiership in May 1940 was "the most significant act of his long career". He argues that later that month, far from being a potential Quisling, Halifax based his policies on rational considerations, and that "on rational grounds, there had been much to be said for the Foreign Secretary's line that Britain should at least have investigated what peace terms were on offer." However, his "most important role in public life" was, in Dutton's view, as Ambassador to the United States, where he helped to smooth a relationship which was "often more fraught than early interpretations ... tended to suggest".

Halifax College at the University of York is named after him. Lady Irwin College, a women's college in Delhi, was established under the patronage of Dorothy, Lady Irwin, in 1931.

== Styles and honours ==
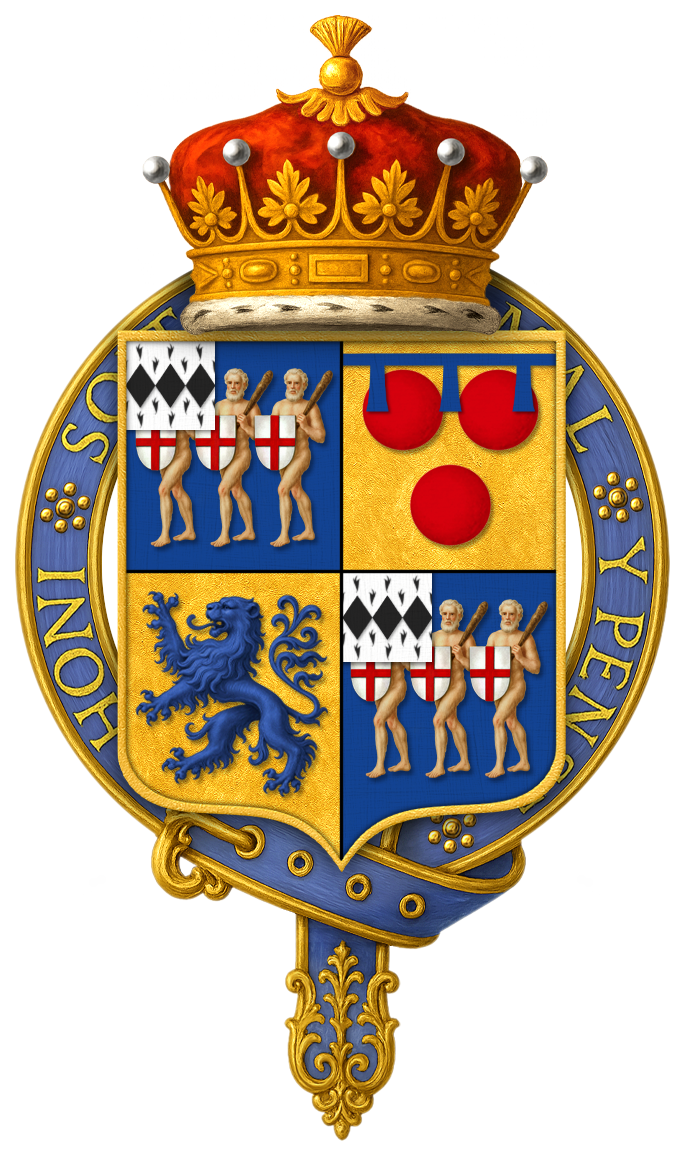
Garter-encircled shield of Arms of Edward Wood, 1st Earl of Halifax, KG, OM, GCSI, GCMG, GCIE, TD, PC (as displayed on his Garter stall plate in St. George's chapel)

- 16 April 1881 – 8 August 1885: Edward Frederick Lindley Wood
- 8 August 1885 – 10 February 1910: The Hon. Edward Frederick Lindley Wood
- 10 February 1910 – 25 October 1922: The Hon. Edward Frederick Lindley Wood MP
- 25 October 1922 – 22 December 1925: The Rt. Hon. Edward Frederick Lindley Wood MP
- 22 December 1925 – 3 April 1926: The Rt. Hon. The Lord Irwin PC
- 3 April 1926 – 18 April 1931: His Excellency The Rt. Hon. The Lord Irwin PC, Viceroy and Governor-General of India
- 18 April 1931 – 19 January 1934: The Rt. Hon. The Lord Irwin PC
- 19 January 1934 – December 1940: The Rt. Hon. The Viscount Halifax PC
- December 1940 – 1944: His Excellency The Rt. Hon. The Viscount Halifax PC, HM Ambassador to the United States of America
- 1944–1946: His Excellency The Rt. Hon. The Earl of Halifax PC, HM Ambassador to the United States of America
- 1946–1959: The Rt. Hon. The Earl of Halifax PC

== Personal life ==
Halifax married Lady Dorothy Evelyn Augusta Onslow (1885–1976), daughter of William Onslow, 4th Earl of Onslow, former Governor-General of New Zealand, on 21 September 1909.

They had five children together:

- Lady Anne Dorothy Wood, OBE JP (31 July 1910 – 25 March 1995); married Charles Duncombe, 3rd Earl of Feversham, on 14 December 1936.
- Mary Agnes Wood (31 July 1910 – 3 August 1910)
- Charles Ingram Courtenay Wood, 2nd Earl of Halifax (3 October 1912 – 19 March 1980)
- Major Hon. Francis Hugh Peter Courtenay Wood (born 5 October 1916, killed in action 26 October 1942 while serving with the Royal Armoured Corps in Egypt)
- Richard Frederick Wood, Baron Holderness (5 October 1920 – 11 August 2002); MP from 1950, holding office from 1955.

== In popular culture ==
Lord Halifax was portrayed in Richard Attenborough's blockbuster film Gandhi by John Gielgud, depicting his time as Viceroy of India and his role in negotiations with Gandhi regarding Indian independence. Halifax was also portrayed, as an antagonist, in the 2017 film Darkest Hour by Stephen Dillane.

== See also ==
- List of covers of Time magazine (1920s) – 12 April 1926

== Bibliography ==
- Churchill, Winston S., Their Finest Hour. New York, 1949.
- Churchill, Winston S., The Gathering Storm. Boston, 1948.
- Colville, John, The Fringes of Power: 10 Downing Street Diaries 1939–1955. New York, 1985.
- Dalton, Hugh, The Fateful Years, Memoirs 1939–1945. London, 1957.
- Gilbert, Martin, Churchill: A Life. New York, 1991.
- Gilbert, Martin, Finest Hour: Winston S. Churchill 1939–1941. London, 1983.
- Gilbert, Martin (ed.), The Churchill War Papers Volume I: At the Admiralty. September 1939 – May 1940. London, 1993.
- Gilbert, Martin (ed.), The Churchill War Papers Volume II: Never Surrender. May 1940 – December 1940. London, 19.
- Gries, Thomas E. (ed.), The Second World War: Europe and the Mediterranean. West Point, New York 2002.
- Halifax, Lord, Fullness of Days. New York, 1957.
- Howard, Anthony, RAB: The Life of R. A. Butler, Jonathan Cape 1987 ISBN 978-0-224-01862-3.
- Jago, Michael, Rab Butler: The Best Prime Minister We Never Had? Biteback Publishing 2015 ISBN 978-1-84954-920-2.
- Jenkins, Roy, Churchill. London: Pan, 2002. ISBN 0 330 48805 8.
- Liddell-Hart, B. H., History of the Second World War. Old Saybrook, CT: Konecky & Konecky, 1970. ISBN 978-1-56852-627-0.
- Lukacs, John, Five Days in London: May 1940. Yale University, 1999 ISBN 0-300-08466-8.
- Matthew, Colin, ed. (2004). Dictionary of National Biography. Vol. 60. Oxford: Oxford University Press. ISBN 978-0-19-861411-1., essay on Halifax (pp. 81–89) written by David Dutton.
- Roberts, Andrew, The 'Holy Fox': The Life of Lord Halifax. London, 1991.
- Schwoerer, Lois G. "Lord Halifax's Visit To Germany: November 1937." Historian 32.3 (1970): 353–375.
- Young, Peter (ed.), Illustrated World War II Encyclopedia. Volume 2. Jaspard Polus, Monaco 1966.

Parliament of the United Kingdom
Preceded by H. F. B. Lynch	Member of Parliament for Ripon; 1910–1925	Succeeded by John Hills
Political offices
Preceded by Leo Amery	Under-Secretary of State for the Colonies; 1921–1922	Succeeded by William Ormsby-Gore
Preceded by H. A. L. Fisher	President of the Board of Education; 1922–1924	Succeeded by Charles Trevelyan
Preceded by Noel Buxton	Minister of Agriculture and Fisheries; 1924–1925	Succeeded by Walter Guinness
Preceded by Sir Donald Maclean	President of the Board of Education; 1932–1935	Succeeded by Oliver Stanley
Preceded by The Viscount Hailsham	War Secretary; 1935	Succeeded by Duff Cooper
Preceded by The Marquess of Londonderry	Lord Privy Seal; 1935–1937	Succeeded by The Earl De La Warr
Preceded by The Marquess of Londonderry	Leader of the House of Lords; 1935–1938	Succeeded by The Earl Stanhope
Preceded by Ramsay MacDonald	Lord President of the Council; 1937–1938	Succeeded by The Viscount Hailsham
Preceded by Anthony Eden	Foreign Secretary; 1938–1940	Succeeded by Anthony Eden
Preceded by The Viscount Caldecote	Leader of the House of Lords; 1940	Succeeded by The Lord Lloyd
Party political offices
Preceded by The Marquess of Londonderry	Leader of the Conservative Party in the House of Lords; 1935–1938	Succeeded by The Earl Stanhope
Preceded by The Viscount Caldecote	Leader of the Conservative Party in the House of Lords; 1940	Succeeded by The Lord Lloyd
Government offices
Preceded by The Earl of Lytton	Viceroy of India; 1926–1931	Succeeded by The Marquess of Willingdon
Diplomatic posts
Preceded by Philip Kerr, 11th Marquess of Lothian	British Ambassador to the United States; 1940–1946	Succeeded by Archibald Clark Kerr, 1st Baron Inverchapel
Academic offices
Preceded by Edward Grey, 1st Viscount Grey of Fallodon	Chancellor of the University of Oxford; 1933–1959	Succeeded by Harold Macmillan
Preceded by Henry Lascelles, 6th Earl of Harewood	Chancellor of the University of Sheffield; 1947–1959	Succeeded by Rab Butler
Honorary titles
Preceded by The Duke of Portland	Chancellor of the Order of the Garter; 1943–1959	Succeeded by The Marquess of Salisbury
Preceded by The Earl of Athlone	Grand Master of the Order of St Michael and St George; 1957–1959	Succeeded by The Earl Alexander of Tunis
Peerage of the United Kingdom
New creation	Earl of Halifax; 4th creation 1944–1959	Succeeded by Charles Wood, 2nd Earl of Halifax
Preceded by Charles Wood, 2nd Viscount Halifax	Viscount Halifax; 2nd creation 1934–1959	Succeeded by Charles Wood, 2nd Earl of Halifax
New creation	Baron Irwin; 1925–1959; Member of the House of Lords (1925–1959)	Succeeded by Charles Wood, 2nd Earl of Halifax
Baronetage of Great Britain
Preceded by Charles Wood, 2nd Viscount Halifax	Baronet of Barnsley; 1934–1959	Succeeded by Charles Wood, 2nd Earl of Halifax
