= Dorothy Wood, Countess of Halifax =

British aristocrat (1885–1976)

Dorothy Evelyn Augusta Wood, Countess of Halifax (née Onslow; 7 February 1885 – 2 February 1976), DCVO, styled as the Lady Irwin from 1925 until 1934, was a British aristocrat, courtier, and Vicereine of India.

Born at Richmond Terrace, Whitehall, London, she was the daughter of William Onslow, 4th Earl of Onslow, Governor-General of New Zealand, and Hon. Florence Gardner, the daughter of Alan Gardner, 3rd Baron Gardner. Her brother, Richard, was a prominent politician and succeeded to the Earldom of Onslow.

She was the wife of Viceroy and Governor-General Edward Frederick Lindley Wood, 1st Earl of Halifax. They had five children, including Charles Wood, 2nd Earl of Halifax and Richard Wood, Baron Holderness. She held the office of Lady of the Bedchamber to Queen Elizabeth The Queen Mother.

Having succeeded the Countess of Reading in 1926 (and Viscountess Goschen in 1929), she was succeeded, as Viceregal-Consort of India, by The Countess of Willingdon in 1931.

The Countess of Halifax became a Dame Commander of the Royal Victorian Order in the 1953 Coronation Honours.
