= Joseph Page (architect) =

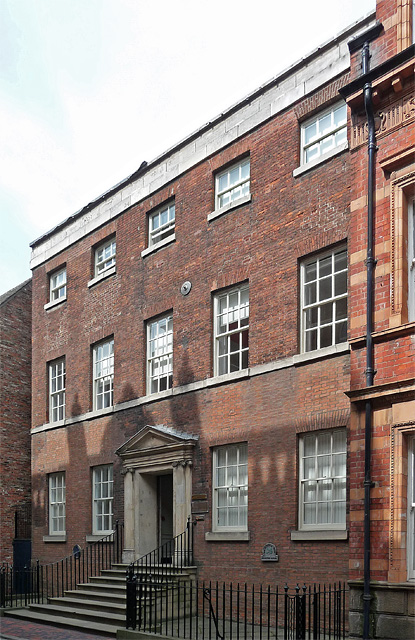
Maisters House, High Street, Hull 1743–44

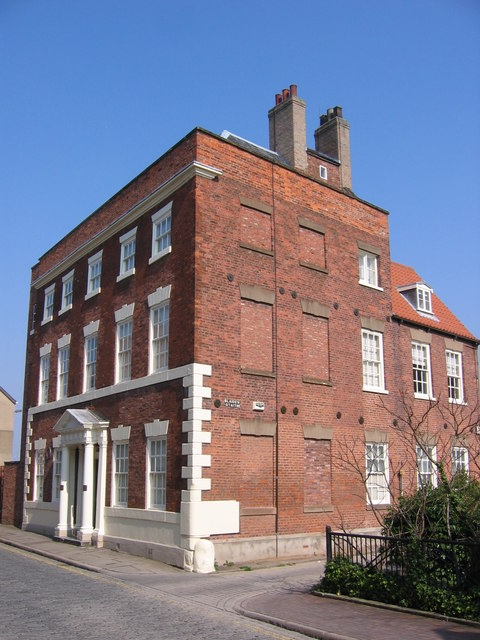
Blaydes House, High Street, Hull 1759

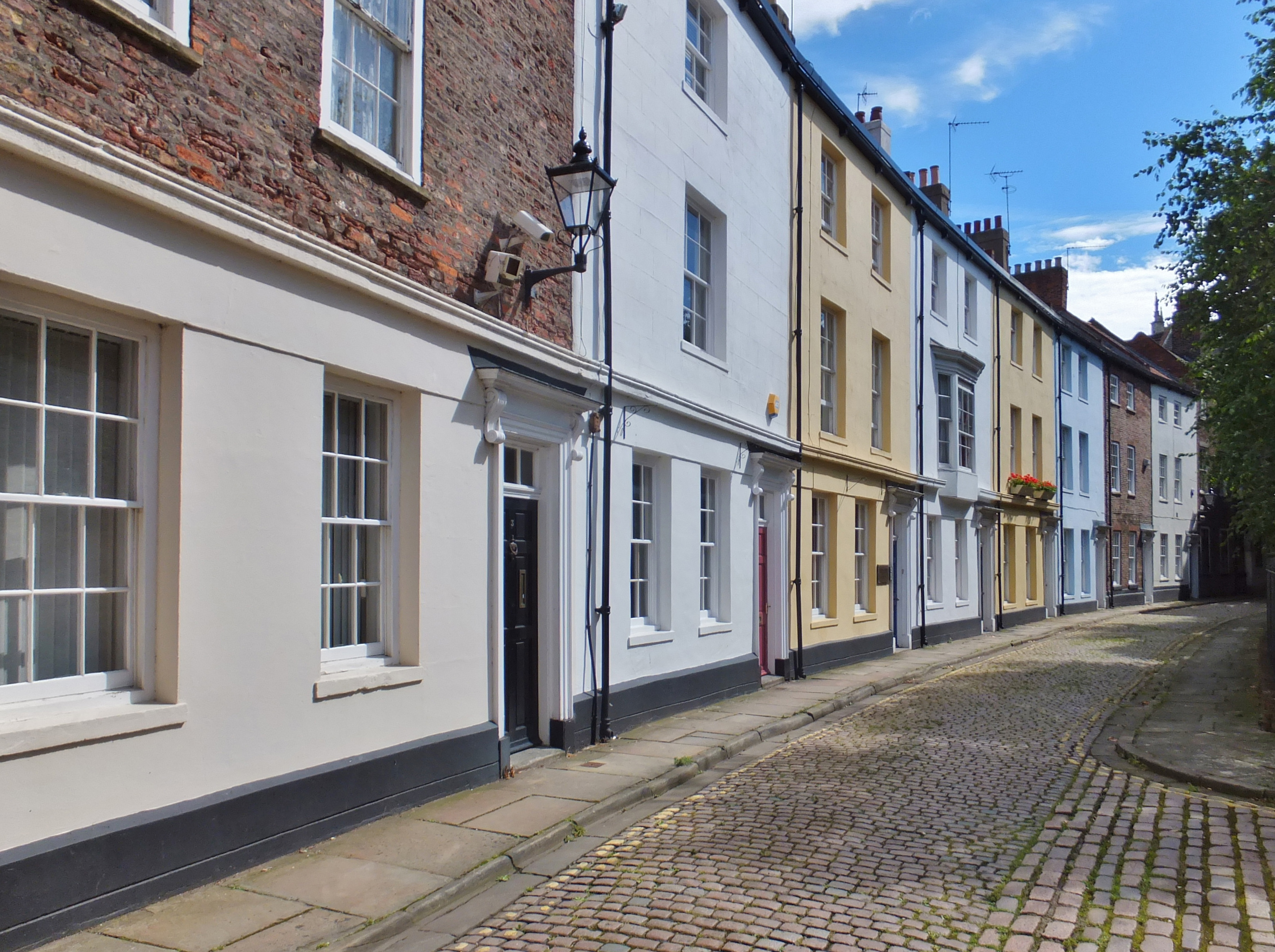
Prince Street, Hull, 1771

Joseph Page (c. 1718 – 23 April 1776) was an architect based in Kingston upon Hull, England.

== Life ==
He was born in Barton-on-Humber, the son of a bricklayer Francis Page and his wife Elizabeth. He was baptised in St Peter's Church, Barton-upon-Humber on 26 February 1718.

He was apprenticed to a Hull bricklayer in 1733 and completed his apprenticeship in 1740. He became one of the leading architects and master builders of Georgian Hull.

He died on 23 April 1776 and was buried in St Peter's Churchyard, Barton-upon-Humber. On his gravestone is the epitaph architect and master builder, of an extensive genius in the liberal arts superior to many and excell’d by few.

== Works ==
- Maister House, 160 High Street, Hull 1743–44
- Etherington House 1750 (demolished 1947)
- Blaydes House, High Street, Hull 1759
- 9–12 King Street, Hull 1771
- 3, 6–12 Prince Street, Hull 1771
- Trinity House Guild Room, Hull 1775
