= Joseph Page (cricketer) =

New Zealand cricketer

Personal information
- Full name: Joseph Elliot Page
- Born: 9 January 1841; Sudbury, England
- Died: 17 September 1907 (aged 66); Khandallah, Wellington, New Zealand
- Source: Cricinfo, 27 October 2020

Joseph Elliot Page (9 January 1841 – 17 September 1907) was a New Zealand cricketer and town clerk in Wellington.

Page played in three first-class matches for Wellington from 1879 to 1881. He was Wellington's most successful bowler in the match against Nelson in December 1879, taking seven wickets for 23 runs, but he was also one of four Wellington batsmen to make a pair, and Wellington lost by 51 runs.

Page grew up in Suffolk in England, and emigrated to New Zealand with his wife in 1877. He began working for Wellington City Council soon after arriving, and served as town clerk from 1886 for nearly twenty years. He died at his home in the Wellington suburb of Khandallah in September 1907 after contracting influenza, aged 66. He left a widow, four sons and six daughters.
