= Garrowby =

Hamlet in the East Riding of Yorkshire, England

Coordinates: 54.005900°N 0.790182°W

- Location within the East Riding of Yorkshire
- OS grid reference: SE793573
  - London: 175 mi (282 km) S
- Civil parish: Kirby Underdale
- Unitary authority: East Riding of Yorkshire
- Ceremonial county: East Riding of Yorkshire
- Region: Yorkshire and the Humber
- Country: England
- Sovereign state: United Kingdom
- Post town: YORK
- Postcode district: YO41
- Dialling code: 01759
- Police: Humberside
- Fire: Humberside
- Ambulance: Yorkshire
- UK Parliament: Bridlington and The Wolds

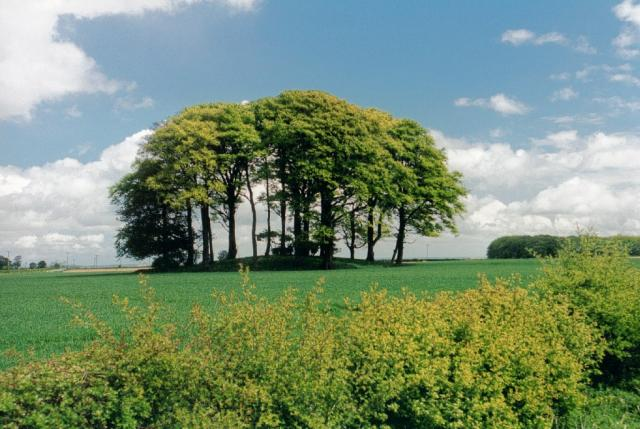
Garrowby Hill

Garrowby is a hamlet in the East Riding of Yorkshire, England. It is situated approximately 5 miles (8 km) north of Pocklington town centre. It lies to the north of the A166 road and forms part of the civil parish of Kirby Underdale.

Garrowby Hill is the summit of Bishop Wilton Wold which is the highest point of the Yorkshire Wolds. It is the subject of a 1998 painting by David Hockney.

Garrowby Hall is a country house which stands in a 13,500-acre (5,500 ha) estate and is home to the Earl and Countess of Halifax. The Wood family (which holds the title of Earl of Halifax) has lived there for some 200 years. It was remodelled in 1980 by Francis Johnson.

== See also ==
- Listed buildings in Kirby Underdale
