= Sloane Place =

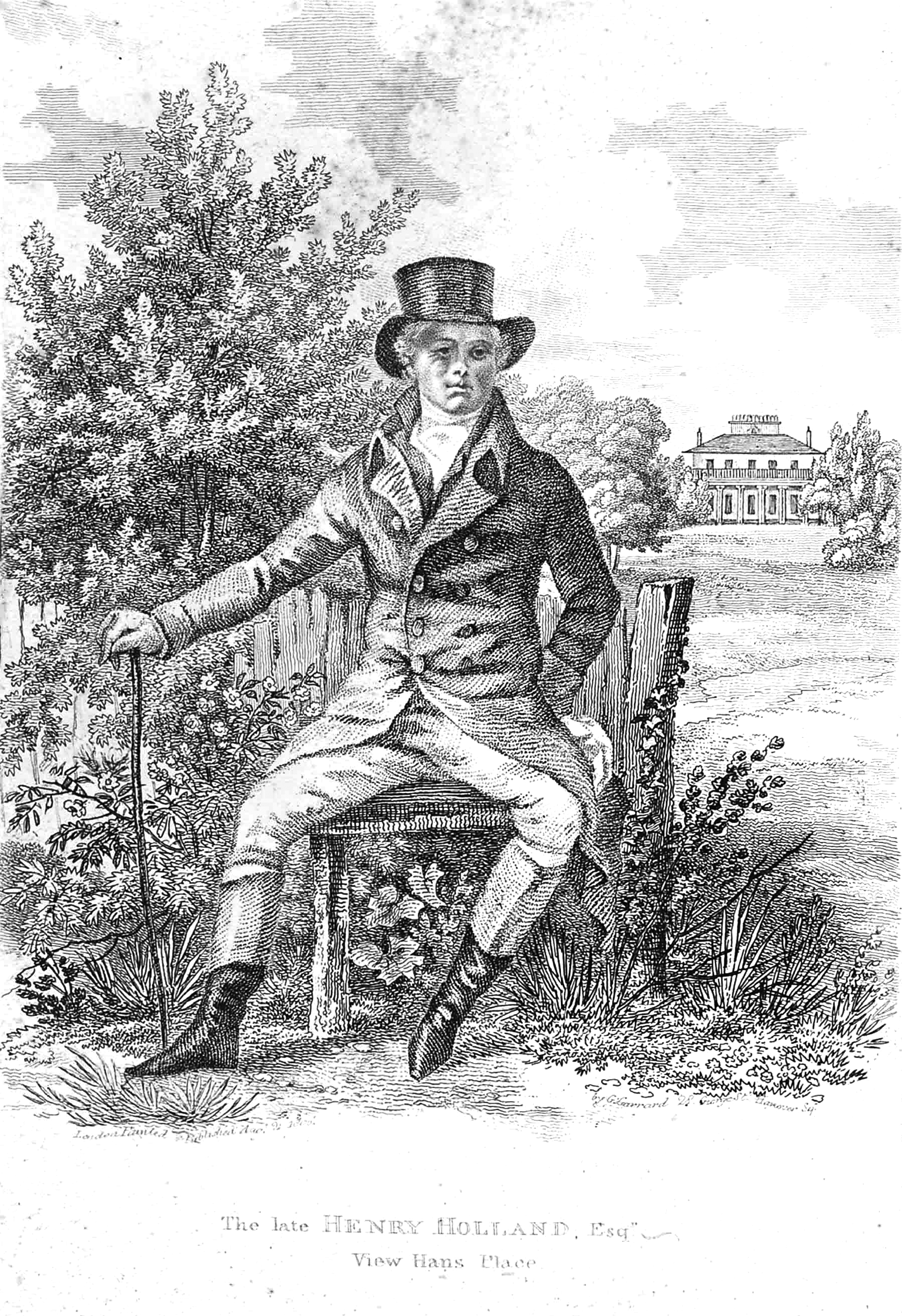
Henry Holland, with Sloane Place in the background

Sloane Place, later The Pavilion, was a large house built by the architect Henry Holland in Knightsbridge, London, and located immediately to the south of Hans Place.

In 1774, Holland leased 100 acres of what had been nursery gardens from Lord Cadogan, to redevelop as housing, including Hans Place, keeping 21 acres to build a property for himself.

Sloane Place was built in 1780, and Holland had moved in by 1789. There were hothouses, a vinery, fruit trees, a Gothic ice-house on the west side of a lawn and a ruined castle/priory.

Holland died there in 1806, after which it was sold on to Peter Denys, who renamed it The Pavilion, and died there in 1816. It was later subdivided, before being demolished in 1874. The site of the house is now occupied by Shafto Mews and is memorialised by Pavilion Road.
