= Denys baronets =

Extinct baronetcy in the Baronetage of the United Kingdom

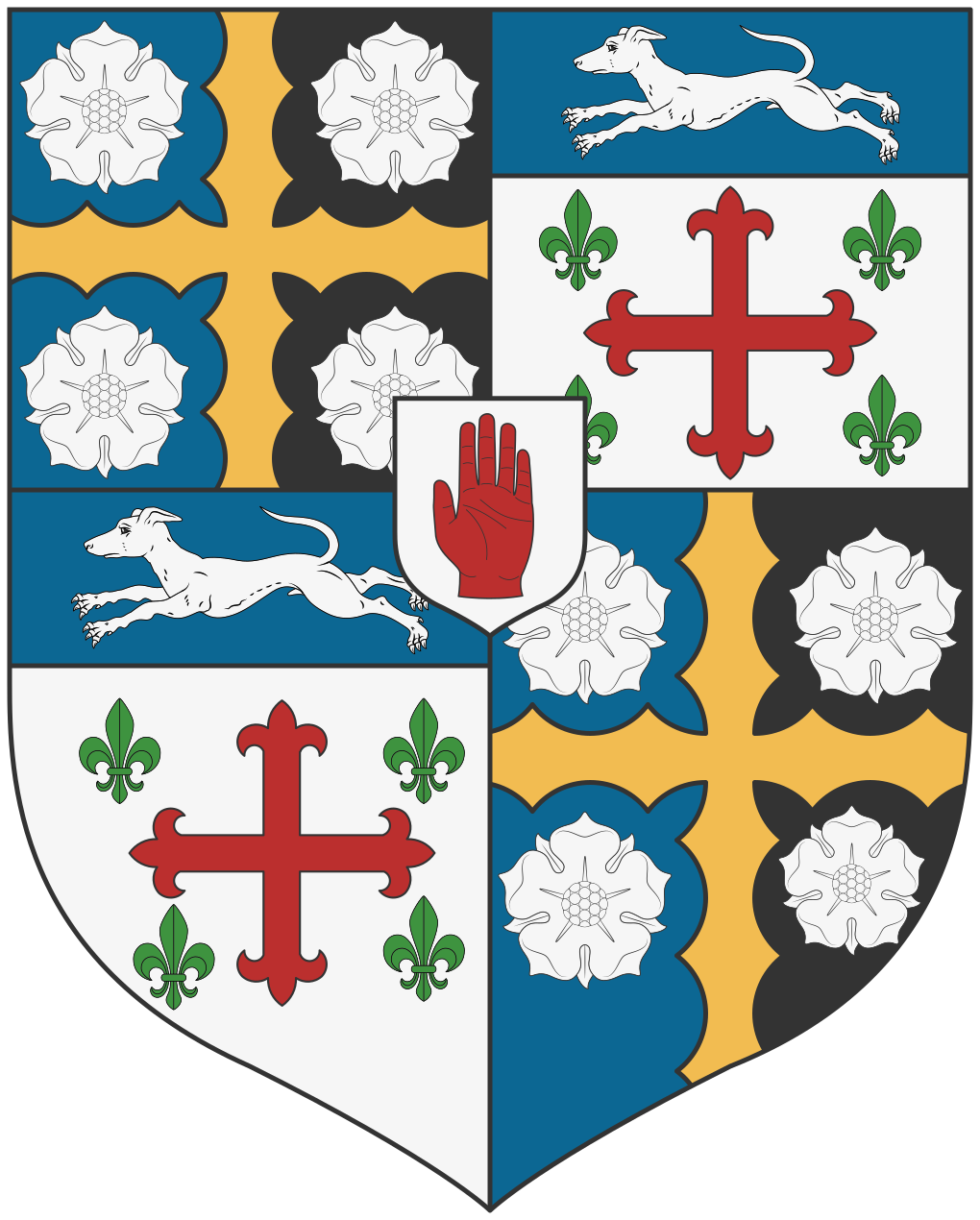
Arms of Denys-Burton baronets

The Denys, later Denys-Burton, later Denys Baronetcy, of Stratford Place in the County of Middlesex, was a title in the Baronetage of the United Kingdom. It was created on 23 November 1813 for George Denys, Member of Parliament for Kingston upon Hull. The second Baronet was a Deputy Lieutenant for the North Riding of Yorkshire. The third Baronet assumed the additional surname of Burton. The fourth Baronet used the surname Denys only. The title became extinct on his death in 1960.

Peter Denys (1760–1816), father of the first Baronet, was High Sheriff of Northamptonshire in 1812.

== Denys, later Denys Burton, later Denys baronets, of Stratford Place (1813) ==
- Sir George William Denys, 1st Baronet (1788–1857)
- Sir George William Denys, 2nd Baronet (1811–1881)
- Sir Francis Charles Edward Denys-Burton, 3rd Baronet (1849–1922)
- Sir Charles Peter Denys, 4th Baronet (1899–1960)

== Arms ==
Coat of arms of Denys baronets
Crest A demi-lion Erminois collared Gules holding between the paws a French lilly slipped Proper. Escutcheon Argent a cross patonce Gules between four fleurs-de-lis Vert on a chief Azure a greyhound courant of the field. Motto Hora E Sempre

Baronetage of the United Kingdom
Preceded by St Paul baronets	Denys baronets of Stratford Place; 23 November 1813	Succeeded by Young baronets
