= St Paul baronets of Ewart Park (1813) =

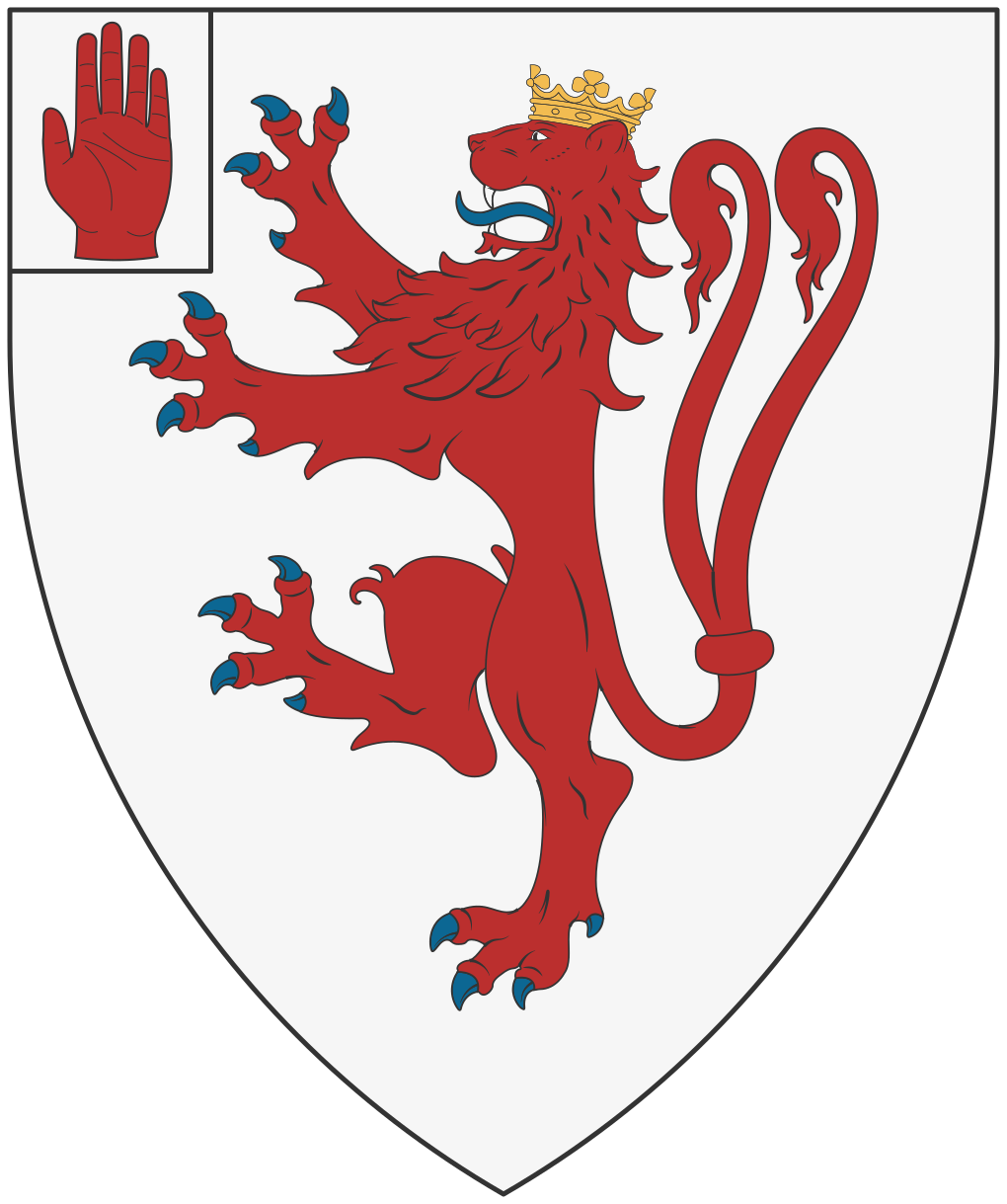
The coat of arms of the St Paul baronets of Ewart Park

The St Paul baronetcy, of Ewart Park, was a title in the Baronetage of the United Kingdom. It was created on 17 November 1813 for Horace St Paul, Member of Parliament for Bridport. The second baronet was member of parliament for Worcestershire East and served as High Sheriff of Northumberland in 1851. The title became extinct on his death in 1891.

The family seat was Ewart Park near Berwick on Tweed, Northumberland.

== St Paul baronets, of Ewart Park (1813) ==
- Sir Horace David Cholwell St Paul, 1st Baronet (1775–1840)
- Sir Horace St Paul, 2nd Baronet (1812–1891)

Baronetage of the United Kingdom
Preceded by Jervoise baronets	St Paul baronets of Ewart Park; 17 November 1813	Succeeded by Denys baronets
