= Clarke-Jervoise baronets =

Extinct baronetcy in the Baronetage of the United Kingdom

The Jervoise, later Clarke-Jervoise Baronetcy, of Idsworth in the County of Southampton, was a title in the Baronetage of the United Kingdom. It was created on 13 November 1813 for Rev. Samuel Jervoise, born Samuel Clarke, who assumed the surname of Jervoise by royal licence in 1808.

The second Baronet sat as Member of Parliament for Hampshire South. He was succeeded by his grandson, who left an only daughter and was succeeded by his uncle, the fourth Baronet. The third Baronet assumed the additional surname of Clarke, a surname also held by the fifth, sixth and seventh Baronets. The title became extinct on the latter's death in 1933.

== Jervoise, later Clarke-Jervoise baronets, of Idsworth (1813) ==
- Rev. Sir Samuel Jervoise, 1st Baronet (1770–1852)
- Sir Jervoise Jervoise, 2nd Baronet (1804–1889)
- Sir Arthur Henry Clarke-Jervoise, 3rd Baronet (1856–1902). He was educated at Eton and was a lieutenant in the Coldstream Guards. He married in 1883 Florence Elwon, daughter of Major Light Elwon, and left a daughter.
- Lieutenant-Colonel Sir Henry Jervoise, 4th Baronet (1831–1908), who became a lieutenant-colonel in the Coldstream Guards.
- Sir Harry Samuel Cumming Clarke-Jervoise, 5th Baronet (1832–1911) married in 1874 Beatrice Evelyn, daughter of William Bruce Stopford Sackville.
- Sir Eustace James Clarke-Jervoise, 6th Baronet (1870–1916)
- Sir Dudley Alan Lestock Clarke-Jervoise, 7th Baronet (1876–1933), married on 1908 Grace Eostre, daughter of Walter Ellison, of Eastbrook, Wellingborough. He died leaving no heir. He had a daughter, Gladys Agnes (b. 1909).

== See also ==
- Clark baronets
- Clerk baronets
- Clerke baronets
- Clerk family

Baronetage of the United Kingdom
Preceded by Borough baronets	Jervoise baronets of Idsworth; 13 November 1813	Succeeded by St Paul baronets
