= George Denys =

English politician

Sir George Denys, 1st Baronet (1788–1857), of Blacklands House, Chelsea, Middlesex, was an English politician.

He was a Member (MP) of the Parliament of England for Kingston upon Hull 1812 to 1818.

== Early life ==
Denys was the son of Peter Denys, an artist. He was of Swiss heritage.

== Arms ==
Coat of arms of George Denys

Crest
A demi-lion Erminois collared Gules holding between the paws a French lilly slipped Proper.
Escutcheon
Argent a cross patonce Gules between four fleurs-de-lis Vert on a chief Azure a greyhound courant of the field.
Motto
Hora E Sempre

Baronetage of the United Kingdom
New creation	Baronet (of Stratford Place); 1813–1857	Succeeded by George Denys
