= Henry Holland (architect) =

English architect (1745–1806)

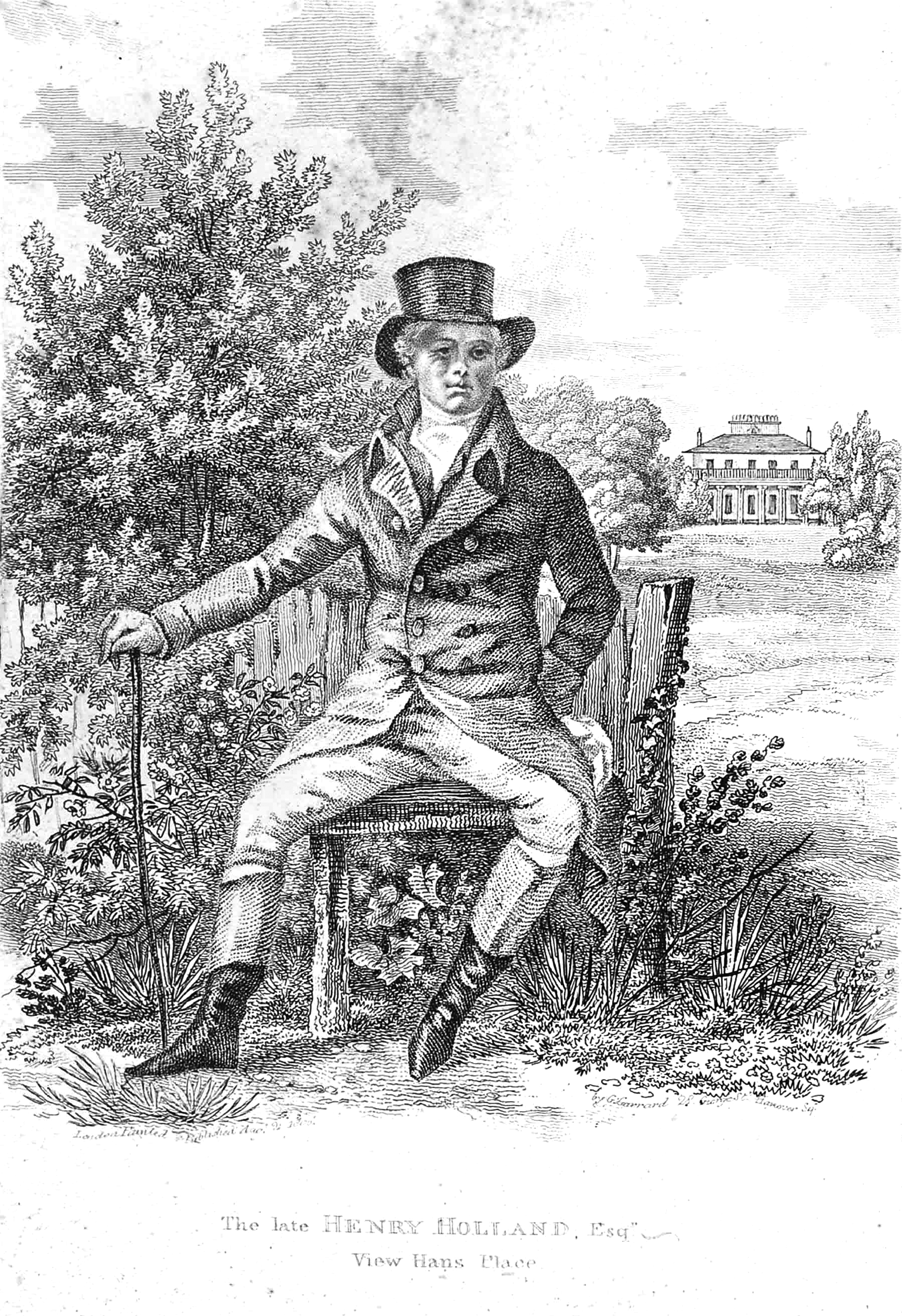
- Henry Holland with his home, Sloane Place, in the background
- Born: 20 July 1745; Fulham, London, England
- Died: 17 June 1806; London, England
- Occupation: Architect
- Buildings: Carlton House, Brighton Pavilion

Henry Holland (20 July 1745 – 17 June 1806) was an architect to the English nobility.

He was born in Fulham, London, where his father, also Henry, ran a building firm constructing several of Capability Brown's designs. His younger brother was Richard Holland, who later changed his surname to Bateman-Robson and became an MP. Although Henry would learn a lot from his father about the practicalities of construction, it was under Capability Brown that he would learn about architectural design.

Brown and Holland formed a partnership in 1771 and Henry Holland married Brown's daughter Bridget on 11 February 1773 at St George's, Hanover Square. In 1772 Sir John Soane joined Holland's practice in order to further his education, leaving in 1778 to study in Rome. Holland paid a visit to Paris in 1787 which is thought to have been in connection with his design of the interiors at Carlton House. From this moment on his interior work owed less to the Adam style and more to contemporary French taste.

Holland was a founder member in 1791 of the Architects' Club, which included Thomas Hardwick as a signatory. In the 1790s he translated into English A.M. Cointereaux's Traite sur la construction des Manufactures, et des Maisons de Champagne. Holland was feeling unwell in the early summer of 1806, on 13 June he had a seizure and his son Lancelot made this entry in his diary on 17 June, "My poor father breathed his last about 7 o'clock in the morning. He had got out of bed shortly before and inquired what the hour was. Being told he said it was too early to rise and got into bed again. He immediately fell into a fit. I was sent for, and a minute after I came to his bedside he breathed his last.". He was buried at All Saints Church, Fulham, in a simple tomb, a few yards from the house in which he had been born. Bridget Holland his wife lived for another 17 years and was the main beneficiary of her husband's will.

== Children ==
Of his sons, the elder Henry Jr (1775–1855) remained a bachelor. The younger son, Colonel Lancelot Holland (1781–1859), married Charlotte Mary Peters (1788–1876) and they had fifteen children. Of Holland's five daughters, two married two brothers, Bridget (1774–1844) to Daniel Craufurd (lost at sea 1810) and Mary Frances Holland (1776–1842) to Major-General Robert Craufurd (1764–1812), commander of the Light Division during the Peninsular War. Bridget later remarried to Sir Robert Wilmot of Chaddesden. The remaining daughters, Harriet (1778–1814), Charlotte (1785–1824) and Caroline (1786–1871) never married.

== Early work ==
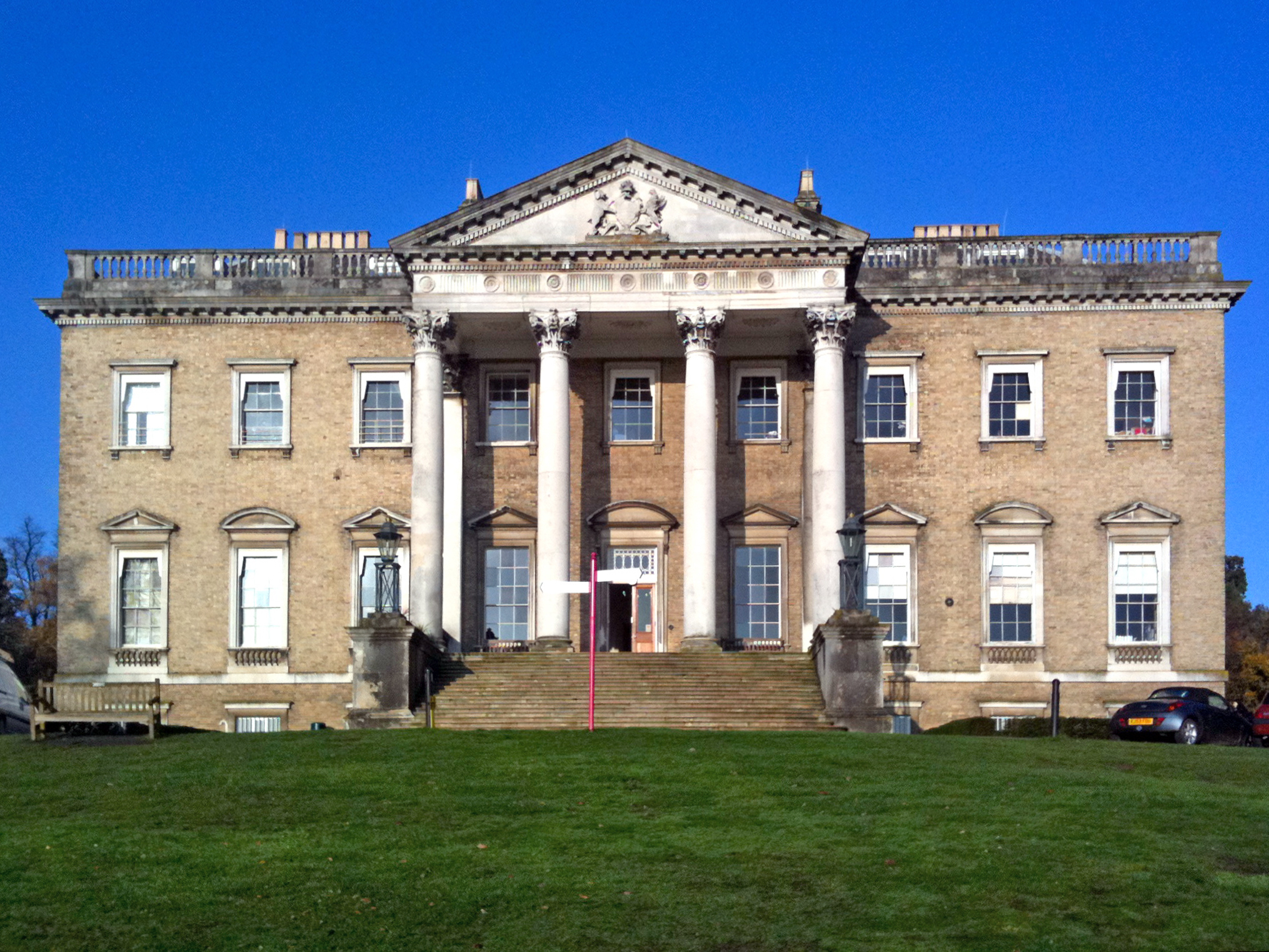
Claremont House, c. 1771

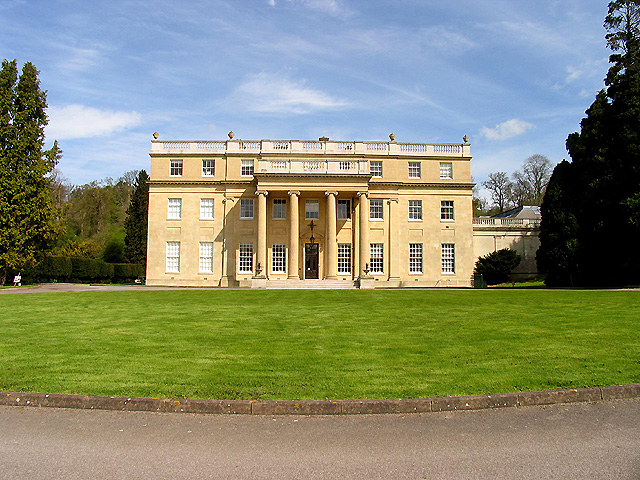
Benham Park, Berkshire 1774–75

Holland began his practice by designing Claremont House for Robert Clive, with his future father-in-law in 1771 and their partnership lasted until Brown's death twelve years later. Claremont is of nine by five bays, of white brick with stone dressings. The main feature on the entrance front is the tetrastyle Corinthian pedimented portico. This leads to the entrance hall with red scagliola columns, these are arranged in an oval with the rectangular room. The drawing room has a fine plaster ceiling and marble fireplace with two caryatids. There is a fine staircase.

In 1771 he took a lease from Charles Cadogan, 2nd Baron Cadogan on his Chelsea estate and began the Hans Town (named after an earlier owner Hans Sloane) development on 89 acres (360,000 m^{2}) of open field and marsh. There he laid out parts of Knightsbridge and Chelsea, including Sloane Street and Sloane Square, and Hans Place, Street and Crescent and Cadogan Place. The buildings were typical Georgian, terraced houses, they were three or four floors in height plus an attic and basement and two or three windows wide, of brick, decoration was minimal, occasionally the ground floor was decorated with stucco rustication. These developments quickly became some of the most fashionable areas in greater London. Construction was slow, the start of the American war of independence in 1776 being one of the factors (Lord Cadogan also died that year). Sloane Square was virtually complete by 1780. Apart from a few houses on the east side Sloane Street was not developed before 1790. By 1789 Holland was living in a house designed by himself, called Sloane Place, it was to the south of Hans Place. The house was large 114 feet in length, to the north the octagonal entrance hall had a black and white marble floor the south front had a one-storey ionic loggia across the central five bays with an iron balcony above in front of the main bedrooms, the rooms on the ground floor south front were the drawing room, dining room, lobby, library and music room. As the area was developed on ninety-nine year leases Holland's houses were almost entirely rebuilt from the 1870s onwards. A few houses survive in Hans Place, Nos. 12 and 33–34. Cadogan Square was laid out from 1879 onwards in part over the gardens of Sloane Place.

Another joint work was Benham Park 1774–75 designed for William Craven, 6th Baron Craven, three stories high, nine bays wide, in a plain neoclassical style, of stone, with a tetrastyle Ionic portico, the building was altered in 1914, the pediment on the portico was replaced by a balustrade and the roof lowered and hidden behind a balustrade. The interiors have also been altered. Though the Circular Hall in the centre of the building, with its large niches and fine plasterwork, is probably as designed by Holland, it has an opening in the ceiling rising to the galleried floor above and a glazed dome. The principal staircase is also original.

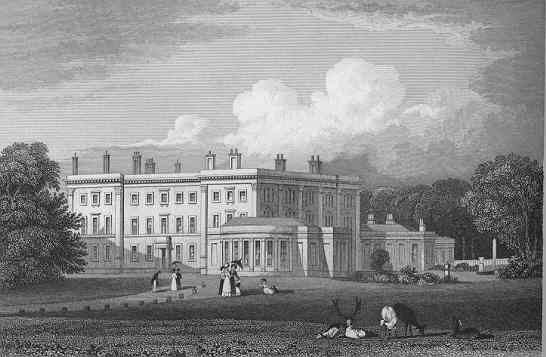
Trentham Hall, 1775–78, demolished

Brown had been designing the landscape of Trentham Hall since 1768, for the owner Earl Gower, when it was decided to remodel the house, this took from 1775 to 1778, it was enlarged from nine to fifteen bays, the pilasters and other features were in stone, but the walls were of brick covered in stucco to imitate stonework. The building was remodelled and extended by Sir Charles Barry in 1834–1840 and largely demolished in 1910.

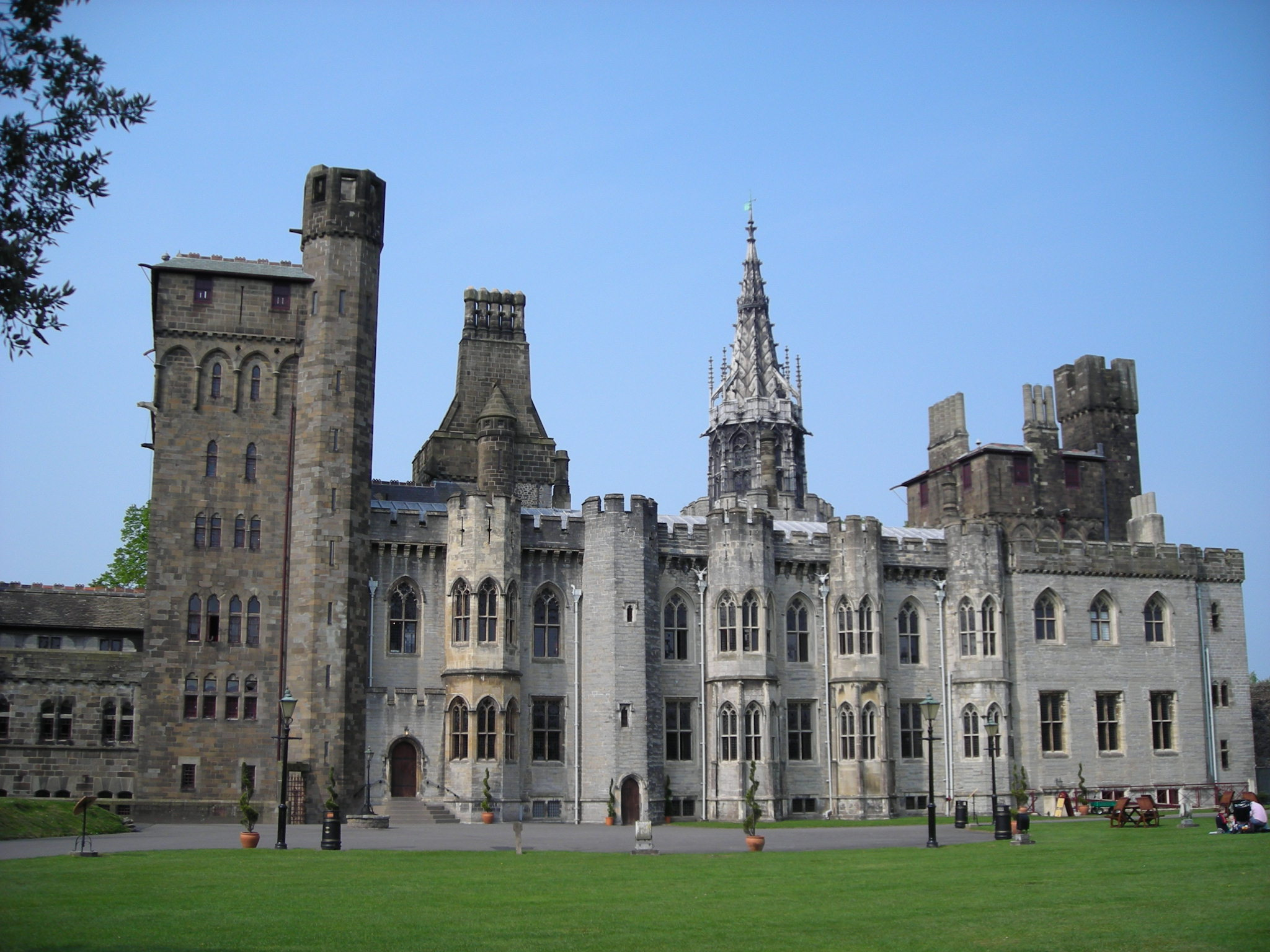
Cardiff Castle (Holland's work is the pale coloured stone)

John Stuart, 1st Marquess of Bute commissioned Holland and Brown to restore Cardiff Castle (1778–80), Holland's interiors were swept away when the castle was remodelled and extended by William Burges in the 1860s. The east front of the main apartments retain Holland's work a rare example of him using Gothic Revival architecture and the neoclassical style Drawing Room being the only significant interior to survive more or less as Holland designed it.

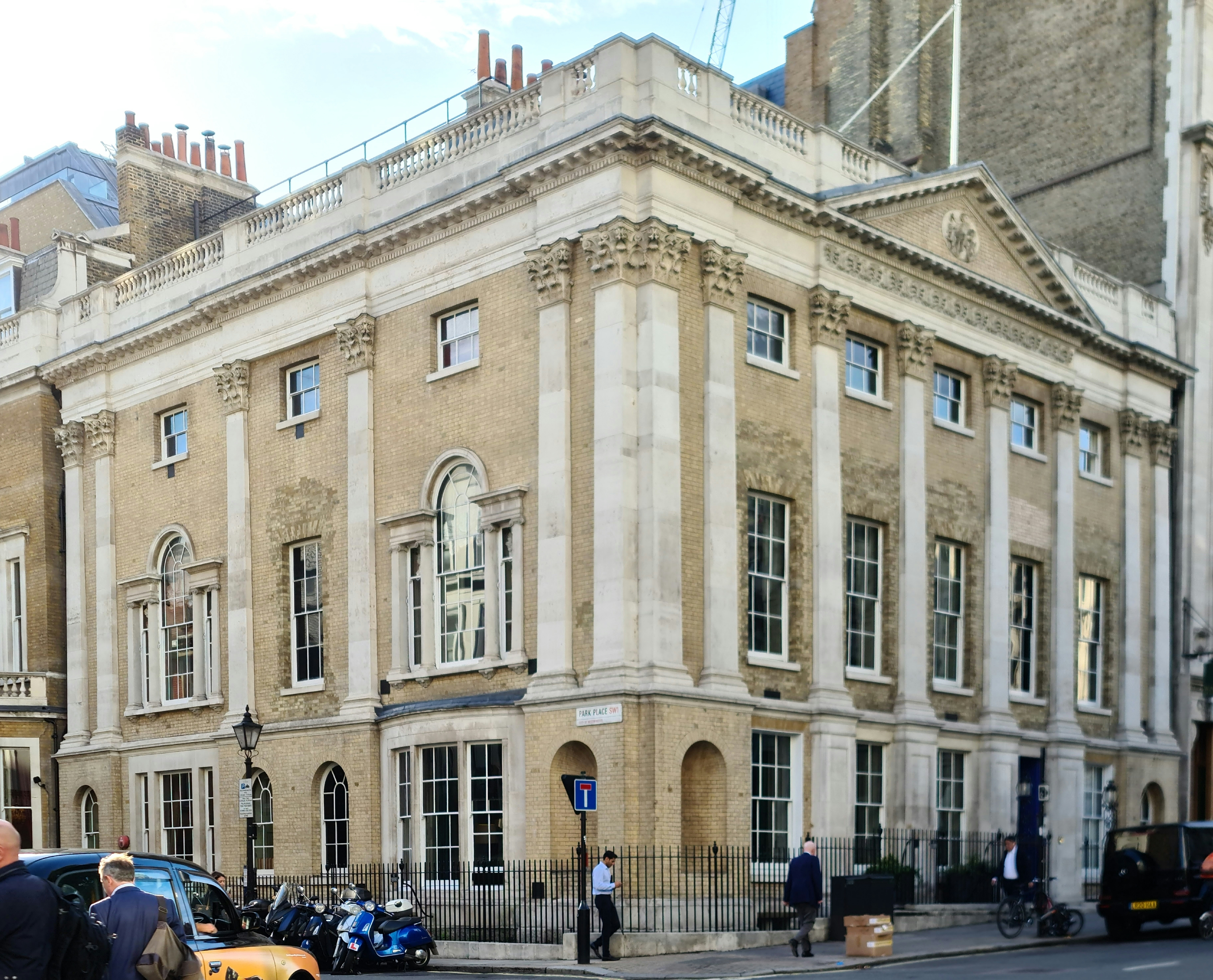
Brook's

In 1776 Holland designed Brooks's club in St James's Street, Westminster. Build of yellow brick and Portland stone in a Palladian style similar to his early country houses. The main suite of rooms on the first floor consisted of the Great Subscription Room, Small Drawing Room and the Card Room, Brook's was known for its gambling on card games, the Prince of Wales being a member. The interiors are in neoclassical style, the Great Subscription Room having a segmental barrel vault ceiling.

From 1778 to 1781 for Thomas Harley, Holland designed and built Berrington Hall, Herefordshire, one of his purest exercises in the Neoclassical style, the exterior is largely devoid of decoration, the main feature is the tetrastyle Ionic portico. The interior are equally fine, the most impressive being the staircase at the centre of the building, with its glazed dome and the upper floor is surrounded by scagliola Corinthian columns. The main rooms have fine plaster ceilings and marble chimneypieces, these are the library, dining and drawings rooms. The small boudoir has a shallow apse screened by two Ionic columns of Scagliola imitating Lapis lazuli. Holland also designed the service yard behind the house with the laundry, dairy and stables as well as the entrance lodge to the estate in the form of a Triumphal arch.

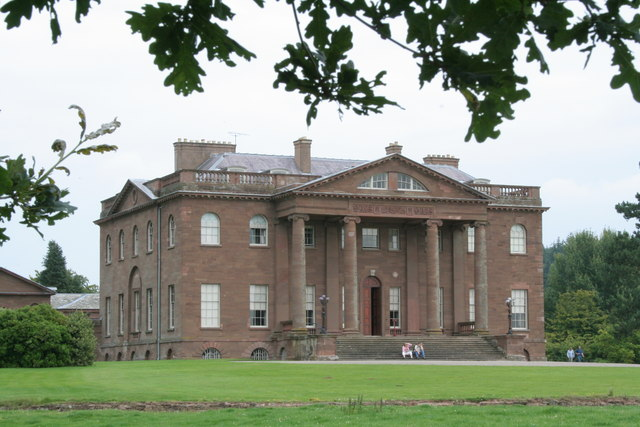
Berrington Hall

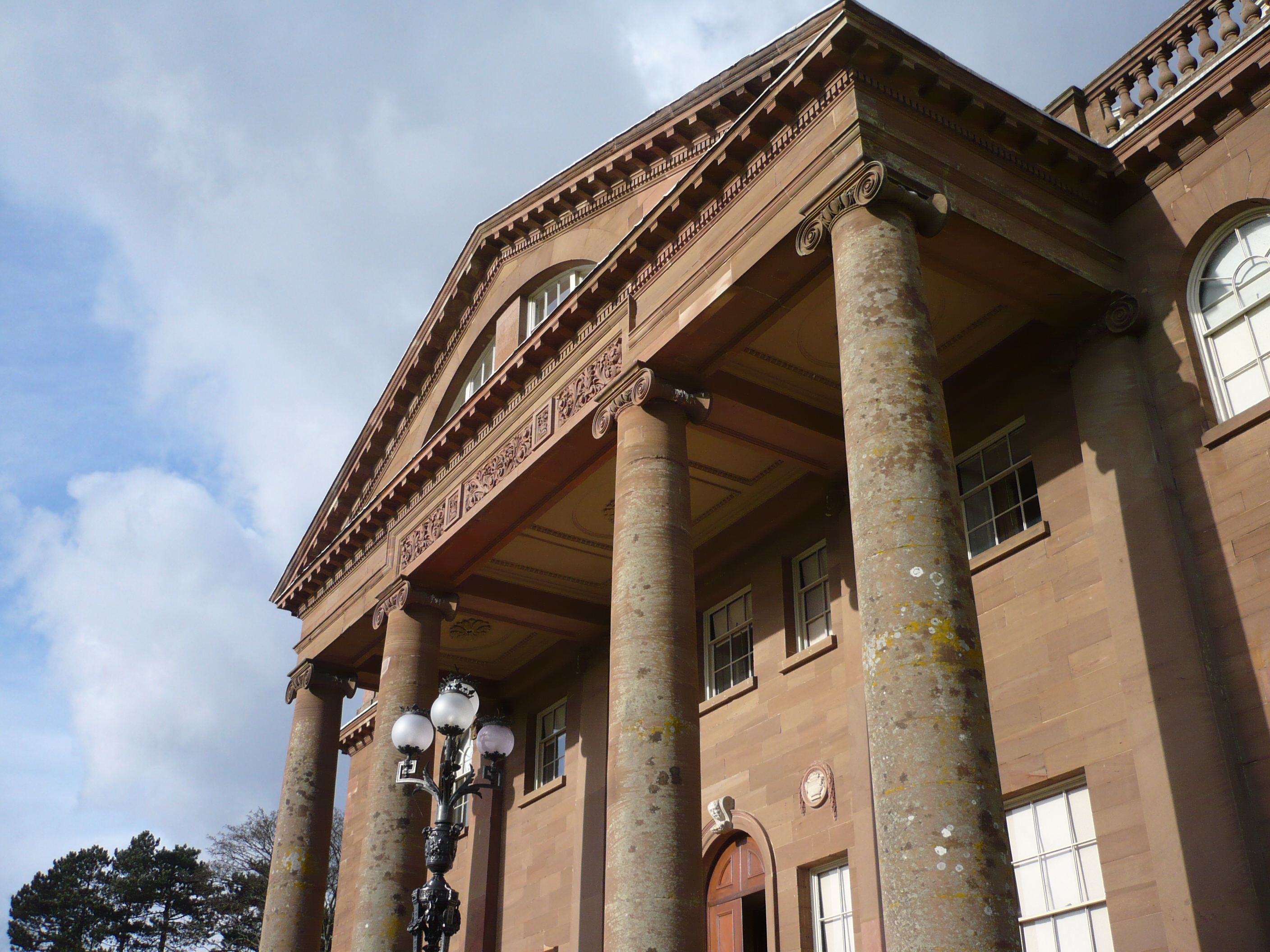
Detail of portico, Berrington Hall

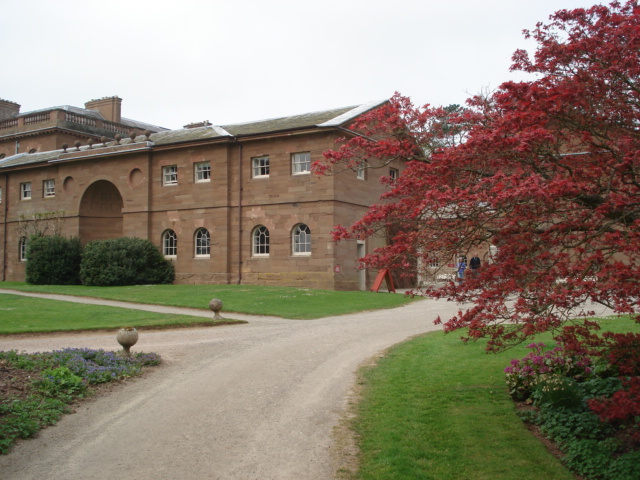
The stables, Berrington Hall

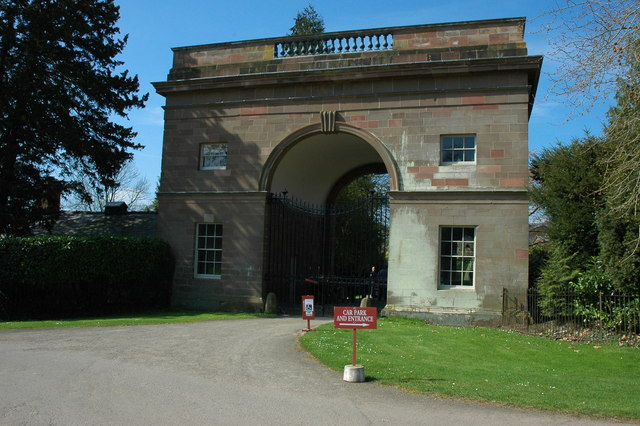
Entrance Arch, Berrington Hall

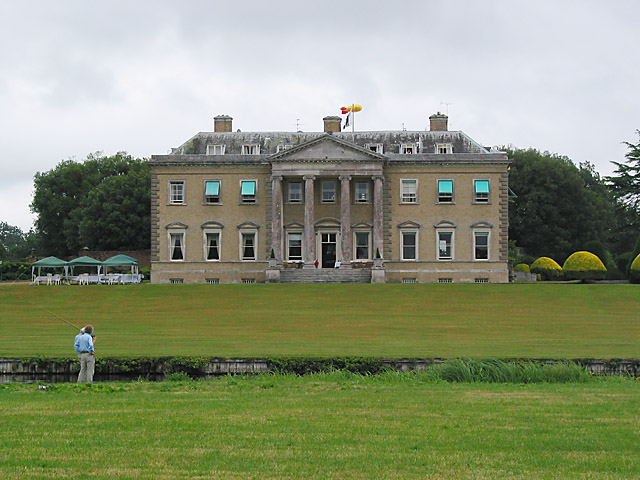
Broadlands House

In 1788 Holland continued the remodelling of Broadlands in Hampshire for Henry Temple, 2nd Viscount Palmerston started by Brown. The exterior was re-clad in yellow brick and a three-bay recessed Ionic portico added on the north front, a tetrastyle Ionic portico was added on the south front, within he added the octagonal domed lobby, also by Holland are the ground floor rooms on the south front library (Wedgwood room), saloon and drawing room, and on the east front the dining room, all in the Adam style.

== Carlton House ==
Holland first major commission for the Prince of Wales, later King George IV, was his celebrated remodelling of Carlton House, London (1783 – c. 1795), exemplified his dignified neoclassicism, which contrasted with the more lavish style of his great contemporary Robert Adam. Carlton House was his most significant work, built on a slope, the north entrance front on Pall Mall was of two floors, the south front overlooking the gardens and The Mall was of three floors. The large hexastyle Corinthian portico on the north front acted as a porte-cochère, after Carlton House was demolished the columns were reused in the construction of the National Gallery by the architect William Wilkins. The principal rooms were on the ground floor as entered on the north front. The various floors were linked by the Grand Staircase, built c. 1786, this was one of Holland's finest designs. Carlton House was demolished in 1827, other significant interiors by Holland were the Great Hall, (1784–89), and the Circular Dining Room (1786–1794). After the demolition many fittings including chimney-pieces were reused by John Nash in the construction of Buckingham Palace.

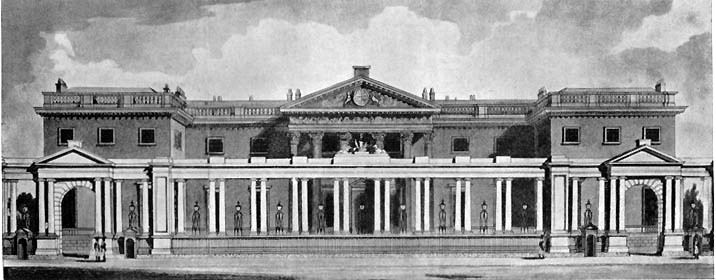
Carlton House

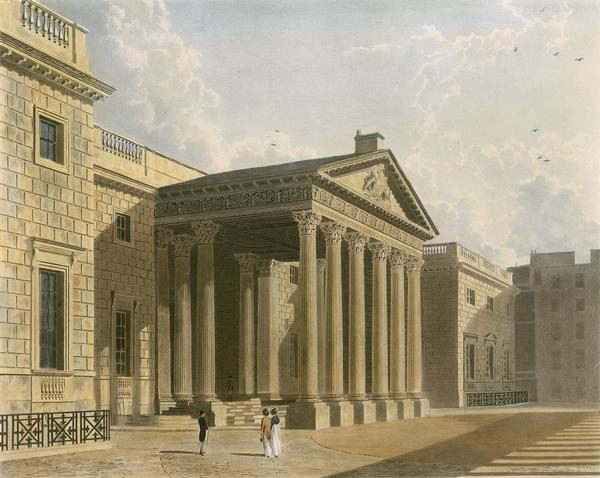
Carlton House, Portico

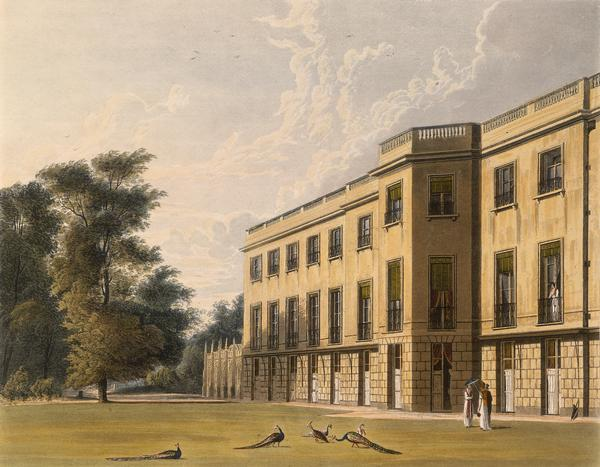
Garden front, Carlton House

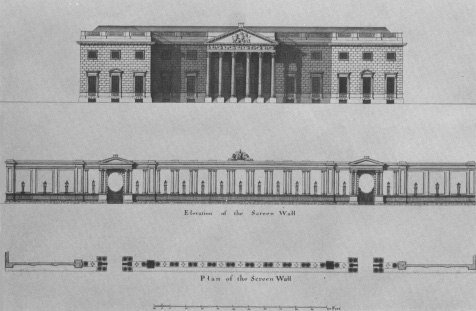
Design for north front, Carlton House

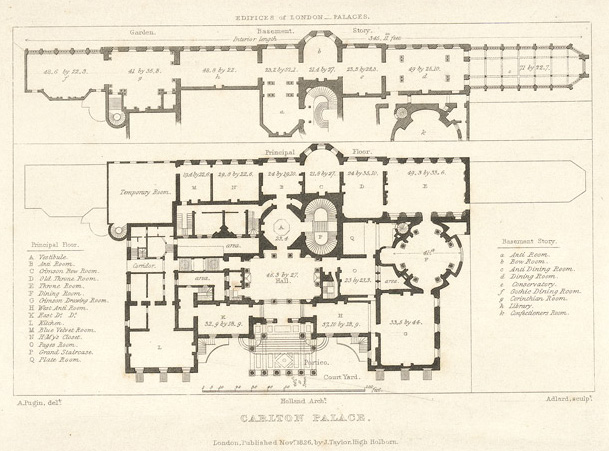
Plan, Carlton House

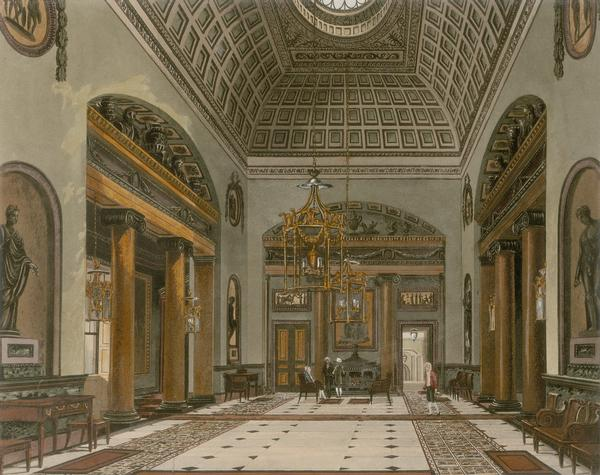
Carlton House, Great Hall

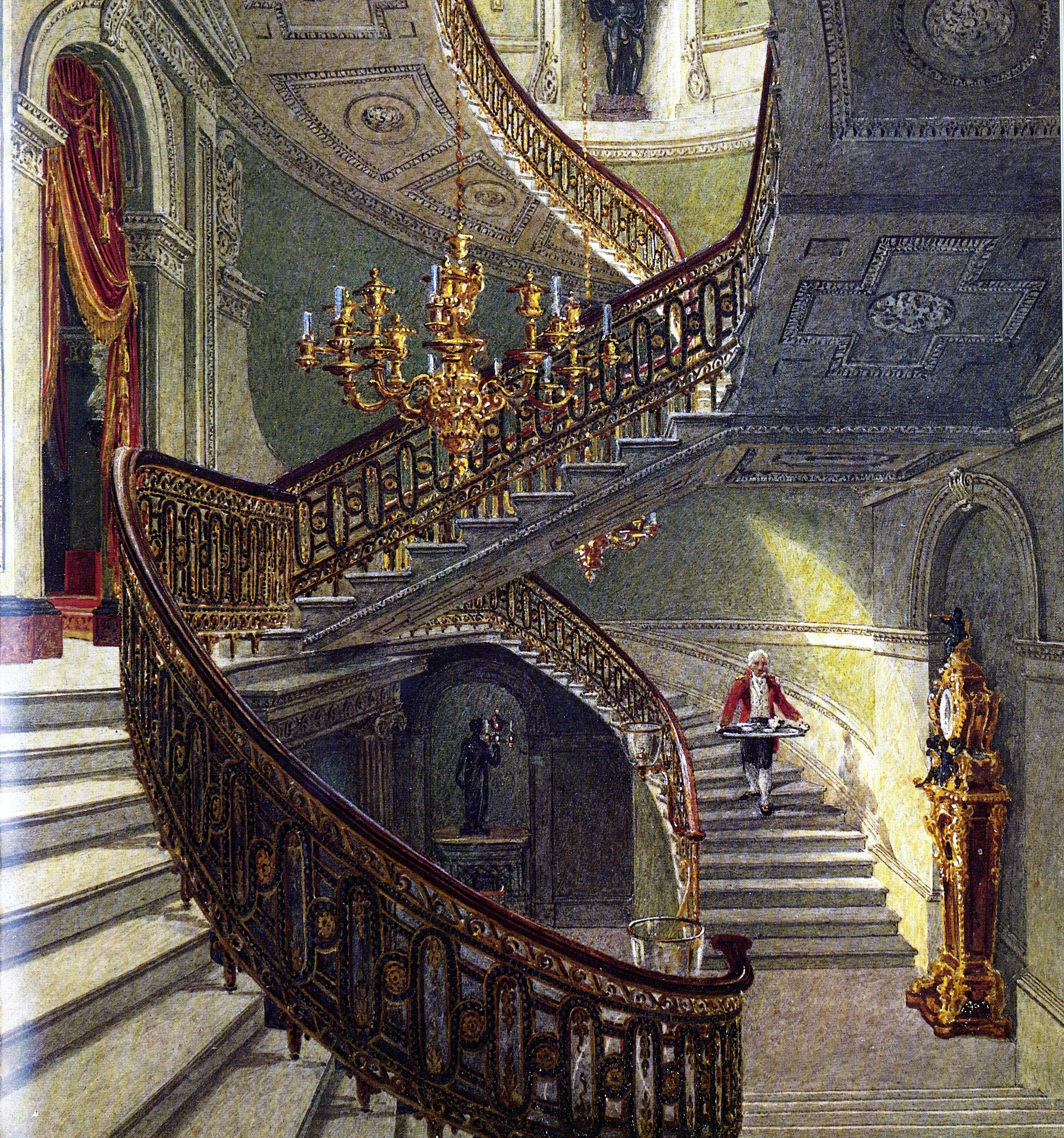
Carlton House, Grand Staircase

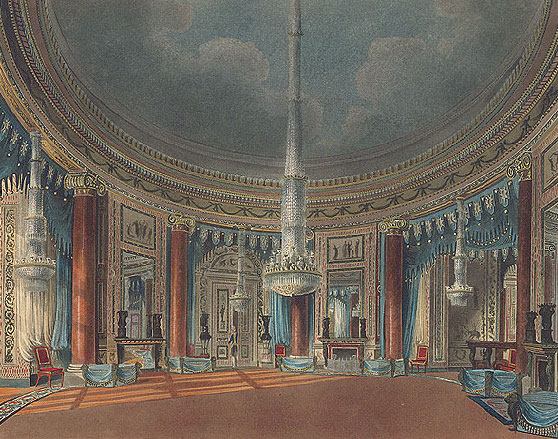
Carlton House, Circular Dining Room

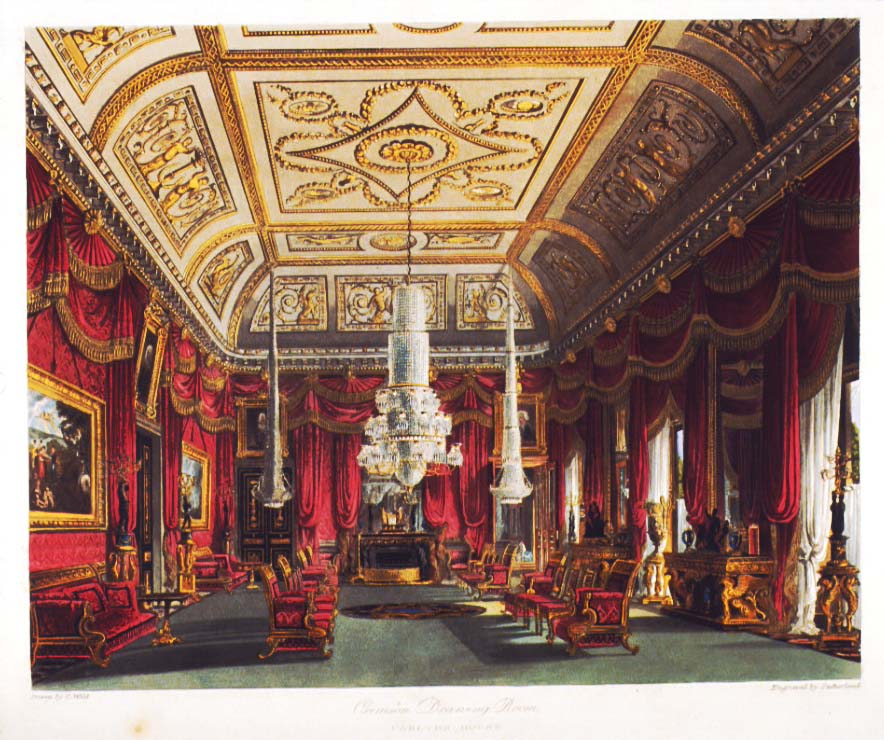
Carlton House, Crimson Drawing Room

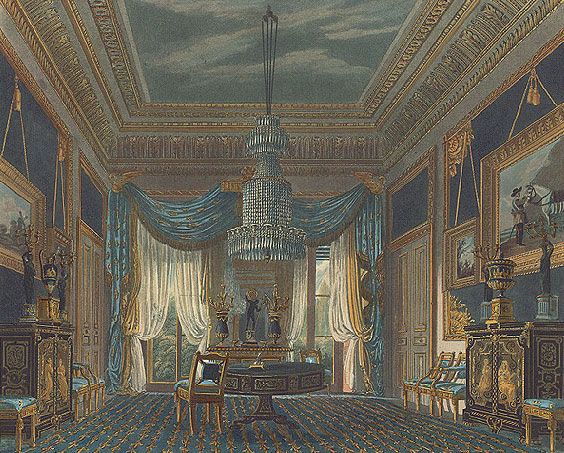
Carlton House, Blue Velvet Closet

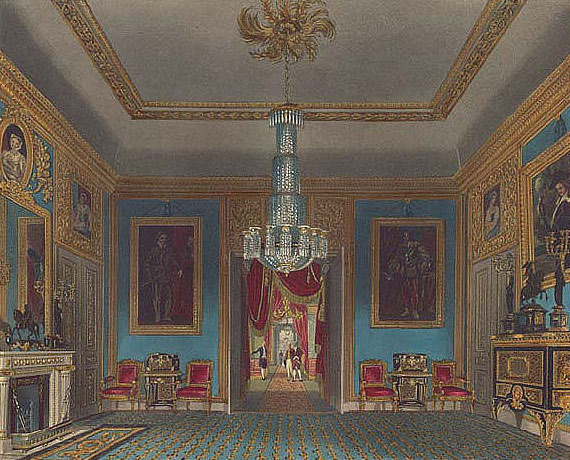
Carlton House, Ante Room

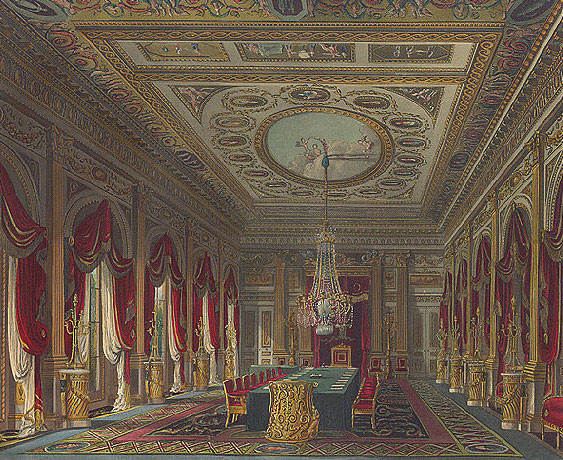
Carlton House, Throne Room

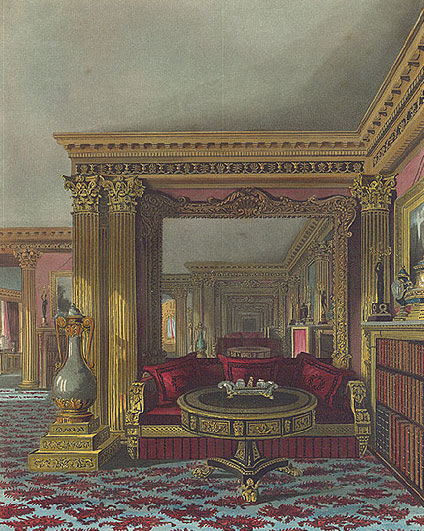
Carlton House, Golden Drawing Room

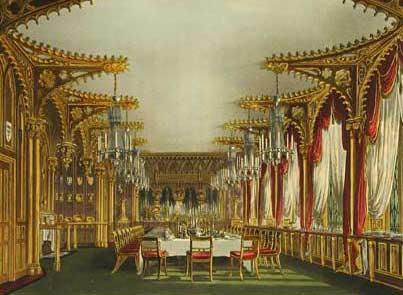
Carlton House, Gothic Dining Room

== Marine Pavilion, Brighton ==
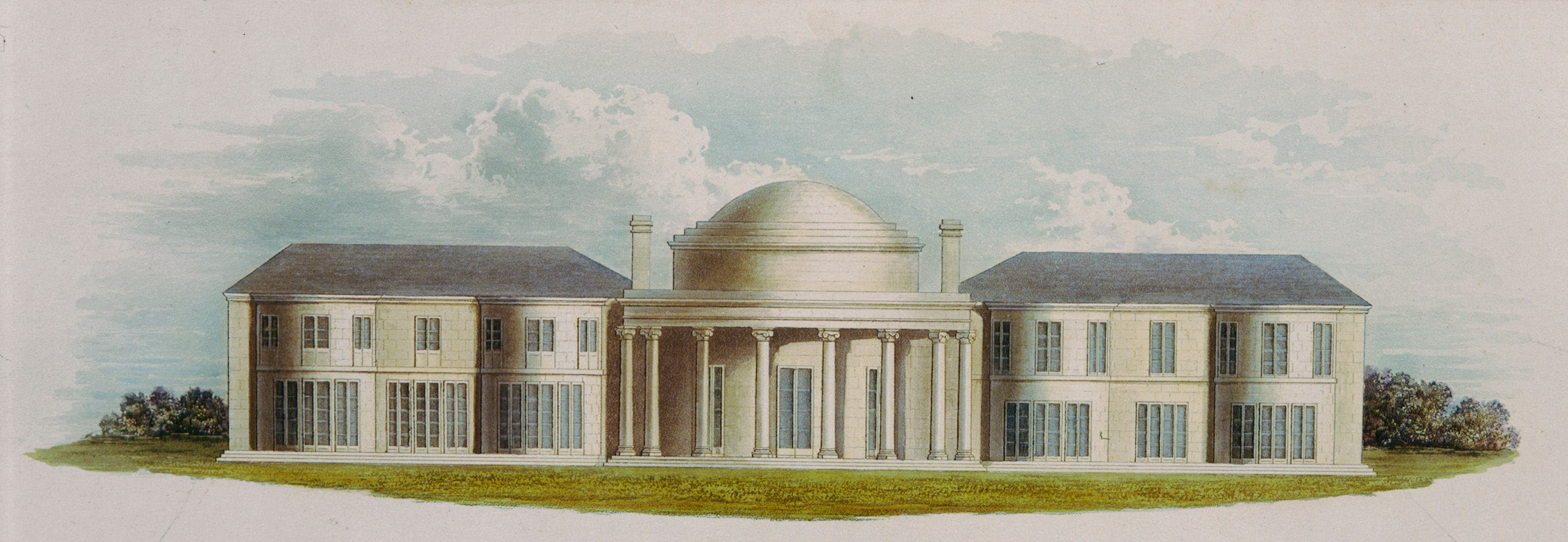
Brighton Marine Pavilion (Royal Pavilion Brighton) as designed by Holland c. 1788

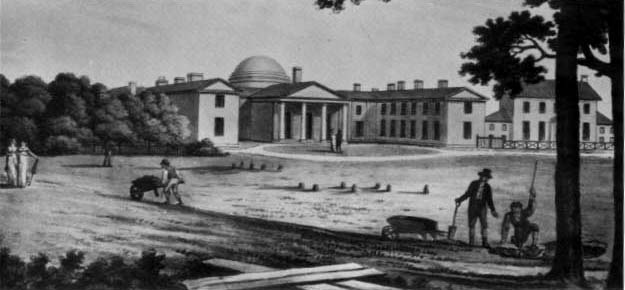
West front, Brighton Marine Pavilion (Royal Pavilion Brighton) as designed by Holland

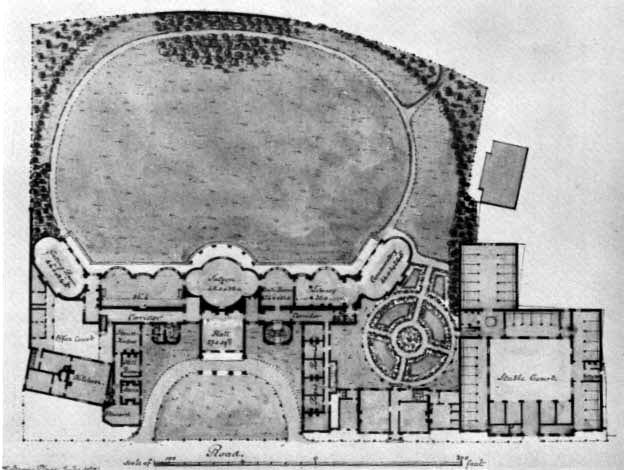
Plan, Brighton Marine Pavilion(Royal Pavilion Brighton) as designed by Holland c. 1802

Holland is perhaps best remembered for the original Marine Pavilion (known as such from 1788) (1786–87) at Brighton, Sussex, designed for the Prince of Wales. The Prince had taken a lease on a farmhouse in October 1786 in the centre of Brighthelmstone, then little more than a village. From 1788 Holland began transforming the building, the east front had two double height bows added, to the north the present saloon was created circular in plan with two apses to north and south, the exterior was of the form of a large bow surrounded by Ionic columns, and to the north of that the farmhouse copied, the west front was quite plain, a tetrastyle, Ionic portico in the centre flanked by two wings forming an open court. Holland proposed further alterations to the pavilion in 1795, but due to the Prince's financial problems were delayed and it was not until 1801 that any work was carried out, this involved extending the main facade with wings at 45 degrees to north and south containing an eating room and conservatory (these were later replaced by Nash's Banqueting and Music rooms) and the entrance hall was extended with the portico moved forward, and three new staircases created within. In 1803 Holland produced a design to remodel the Pavilion in Chinese style but this was not executed.

== Later work ==
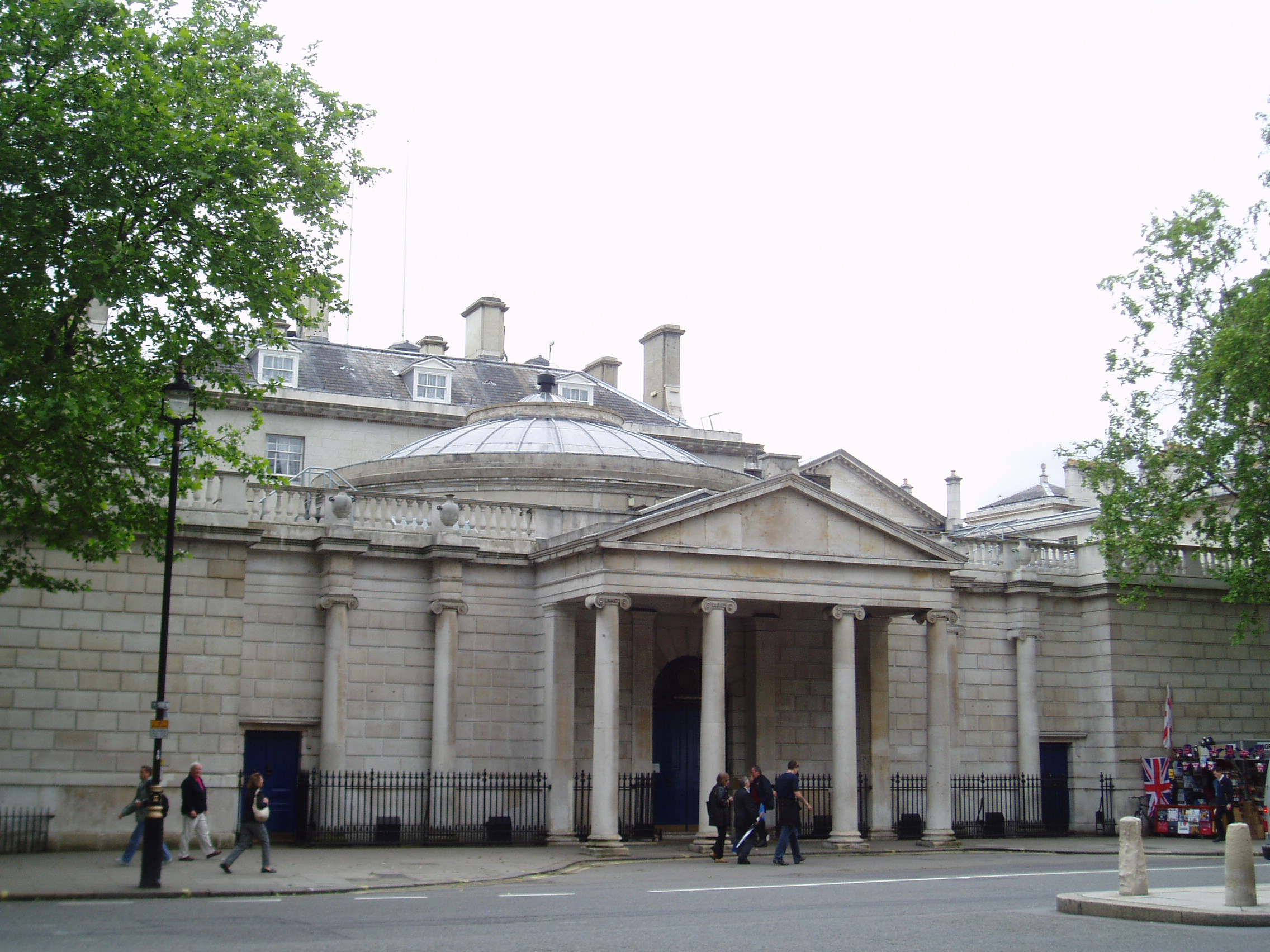
Entrance front, Dover House, Whitehall

The Prince of Wales's brother Prince Frederick, Duke of York and Albany commissioned Holland to extend Dover House (then called York House), and work started in 1788. He designed the Whitehall façade with its portico and behind it the circular domed vestibule 40 feet in diameter with an inner ring of eight scagliola Doric columns.

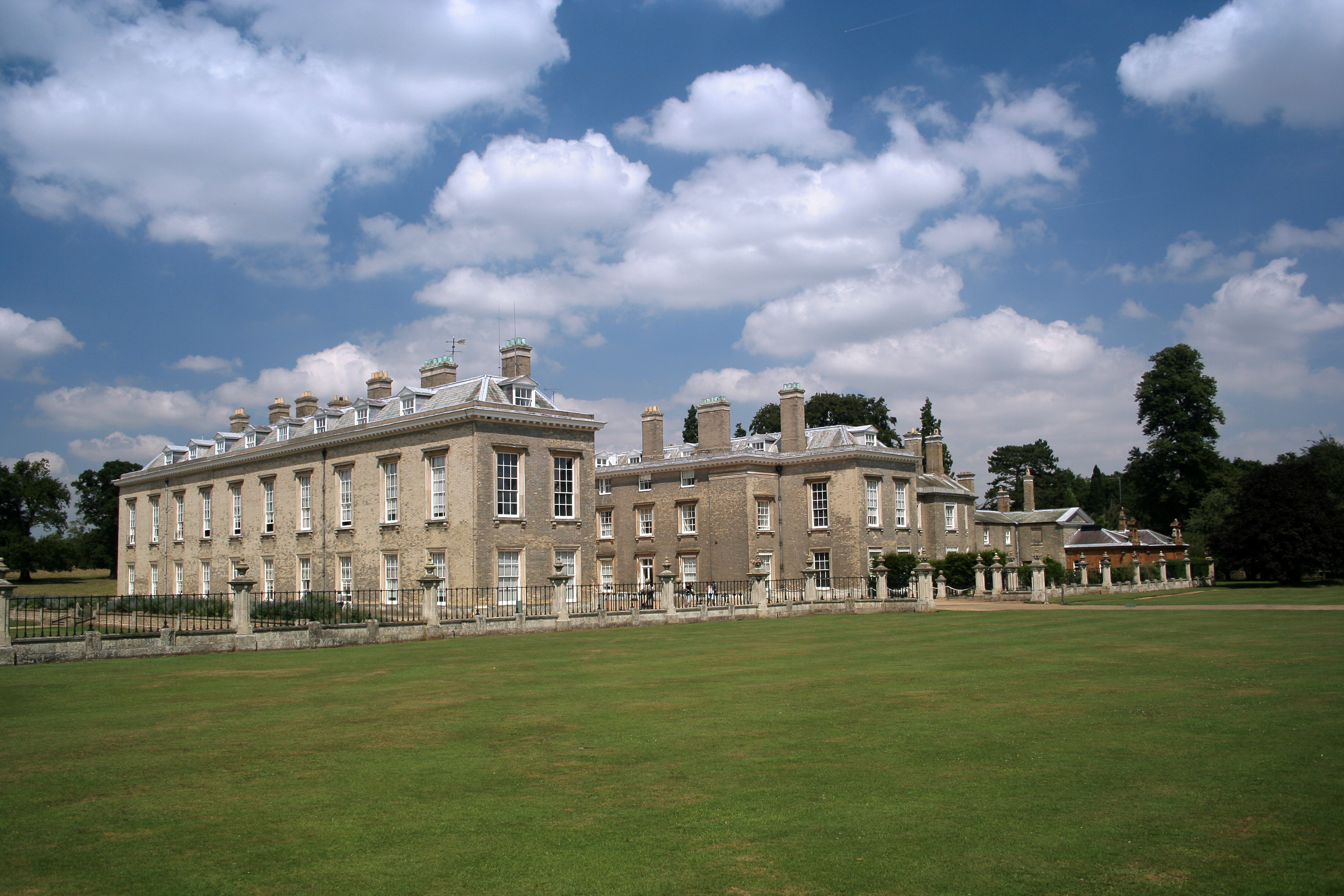
Entrance front, Althorp House

In 1785 George Spencer, 2nd Earl Spencer entrusted Holland with the remodelling of his country house Althorp. The exterior was encased in white Mathematical tiles to hide the unfashionable red brick and he added the four Corinthian pilasters to the entrance front. He also added the corridors to the wings. Several interiors are by Holland: the Library, Billiard Room and the South Drawing Room. He also remodelled the Picture Gallery.

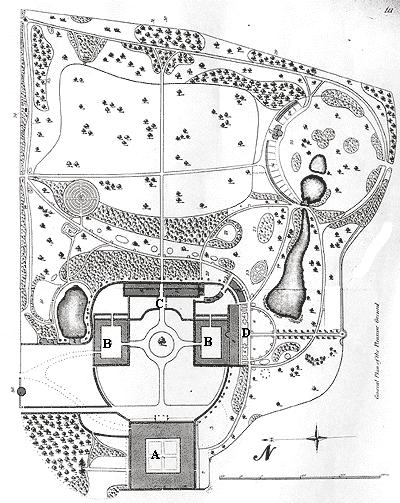
Layout of Woburn Abbey 1816

Francis Russell, 5th Duke of Bedford, one of the Prince of Wales's friends, commissioned Holland to remodel and extend his country residence Woburn Abbey beginning in 1786. This involved a remodelling the south front and within the south wing Holland remodelled several rooms (1787–1790), including the Venetian Room to house twenty four paintings of Venice by Canaletto, the Ante-Library and the Library, a tripartite room divided by openings containing two columns of the Corinthian order. Also he created the greenhouse (1789) (later altered by Jeffry Wyattville c. 1818) attached to the stable block, a grand riding-school (1789) demolished, indoor tennis court, demolished and Chinese style dairy (1789). Within the park he also designed a new entrance archway (1790), farm buildings, cottages and kennels. In 1801 he converted the greenhouse into a sculpture gallery to house the Duke's collection of Roman sculpture, adding the 'Temple of Liberty' at the east end to house busts of Charles James Fox and other prominent Whigs.

Holland went on to design the Theatre Royal, Drury Lane, when it was rebuilt (c. 1791–94) as Europe's largest functioning theatre with 3,919 seats. The building was 300 feet in length, 155 feet in width and 108 feet tall. The Portland stone exterior was of four floors, rising a floor higher above the stage. The facades were fairly plain, with the main embellishments on the ground floor. A single-storey Ionic colonnade surrounded the building, with shops and taverns behind it. The auditorium was approximately semi-circular in plan, with the Pit. There was a row of eight boxes flanking each side of the Pit, two levels of boxes above, then two galleries above them. The stage was 42 feet wide and 34 feet to the top of the scenery. The Theatre Royal burnt down on the night of 24 February 1809. At the Royal Opera House he rebuilt the auditorium in 1792. The new auditorium contained a pit and four horseshoe shaped, straight-sided tiers. The first three were boxes, and the fourth was the two-shilling gallery. The ceiling was painted to resemble the sky. In addition Holland extended the theatre to provide room for the Scene Painters, Scene Room, Green room, Dressing Rooms, etc. The theatre burnt down on 20 September 1808. From 1802 Holland converted York House on Piccadilly into the Albany apartments.

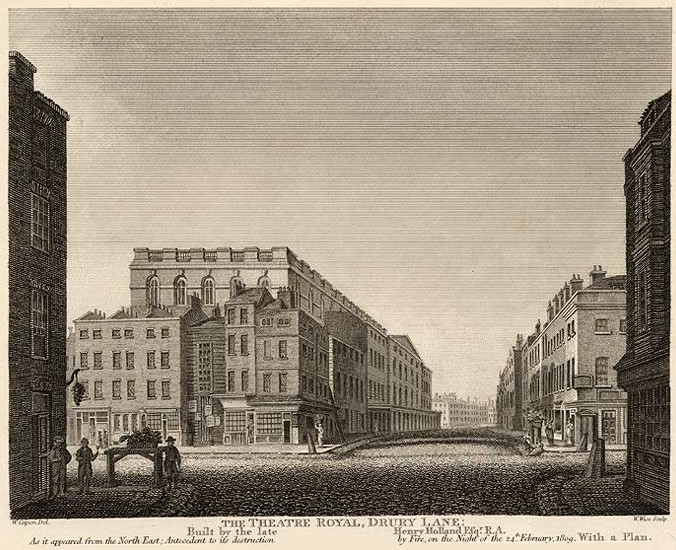
The Exterior, Theatre Royal Drury Lane, burnt down 1809

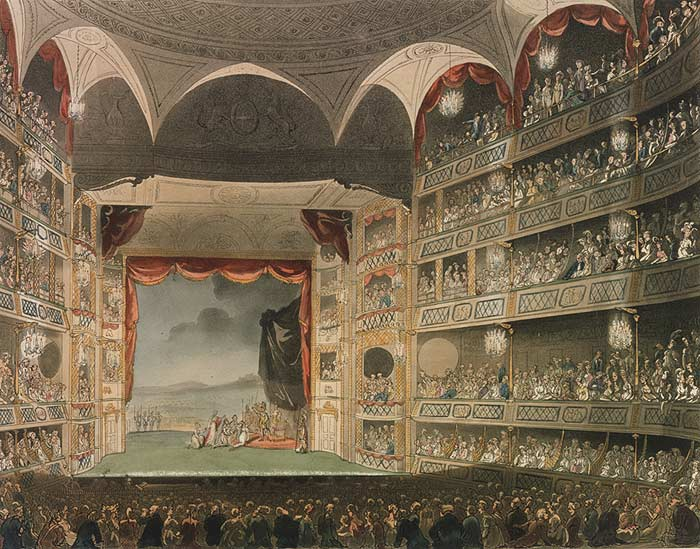
The Interior, Theatre Royal Drury Lane, burnt down 1809

Covent Garden Theatre, burnt down 1808

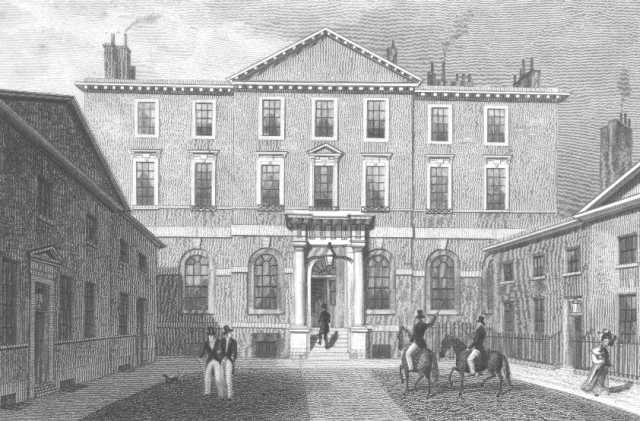
The Albany

In 1796 Holland started remodelling Southill House Southill, Bedfordshire for Samuel Whitbread with work continuing until 1802. The exterior was remodelled with loggias and a portico with Ionic columns and the interiors completely modernised in the latest French Directoire style. The finest interiors are the library, drawing room, dining room, Mrs. Whitbread's room and the boudoir. In the garden Holland created the north terrace and the temple with four Tuscan columns.

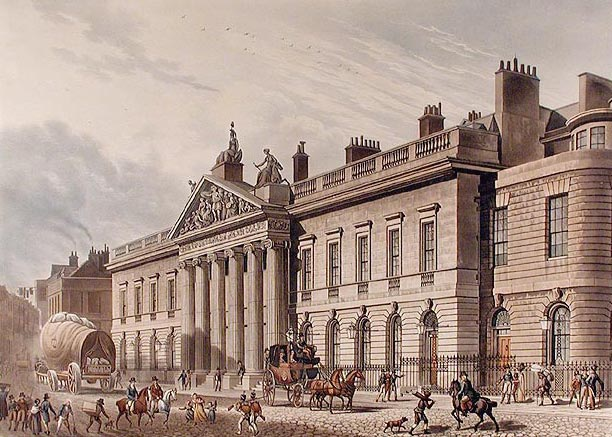
East India House, City of London, demolished

In 1796 Holland received the commission to design the new headquarters for the East India Company, East India House in Leadenhall Street. In order to find a suitable design a competition had been held between Holland, John Soane and George Dance. The building was of two stories and fifteen bays in length, the centre five having a portico of six Ionic columns that only projected by the depth of a column from the facade. The building was demolished in 1861–1862.

== List of architectural work ==
Projects marked # were joint works with Brown.

- Hale House, Hampshire, alterations (1770)
- Hill Park, near Westerham, Kent, (c. 1770) subsequently altered and renamed Valence
- Battersea Bridge, the original wooden bridge (1771–1772) demolished 1881
- #Claremont House (1771–74)
- #Benham Park (1774–75)
- #Trentham Hall remodelled (1775–1780), later remodelled by Sir Charles Barry (1834–49) demolished 1910
- #Cadland, near Southampton (1775–78) demolished 1953
- Brooks's club London (1776–1778)
- #Cardiff Castle reconstruction in a Gothic style (1777–1778)
- Hans Town, London, including Cadogan Place, Sloane Street & Sloane Square, (1777–1791), few of his buildings survive
- The Crown Hotel, Stone, Staffordshire (1778)
- Berrington Hall (1778–81)
- St. Michael's Church, Chart Sutton, rebuilt except for the tower (1779) altered in the 19th century
- #Nuneham House alterations (1781–1782)
- Grangemouth, he devised the plan for the town, (1781–83)
- 7 St. James's Square, London, refronted (1782)
- Carlton House, London (1783–95) demolished 1827.
- Spencer House, London, internal alterations (1785–1792)
- Royal Pavilion Brighton, (1786–87) remodelled by John Nash (1815–22)
- Bedford House, Bloomsbury, remodelled dining room (1787) demolished 1800
- Knight's Hill, Norwood, Surrey, (1787) demolished 1810
- Stanmore Park, Stanmore, Middlesex, (1787) demolished
- Woburn Abbey, the south front, library, stables, sculpture gallery, Chinese dairy, entrance lodge (1787–1802)
- Althorp remodelled the exterior and interior (1787–1789)
- 105 Pall Mall, London, remodelled interior (1787) demolished 1838
- Dover House (was York House), Whitehall, extended the house adding the grand pillared & domed entrance hall and facade & portico on Whitehall (1789–1792)
- House, Allerton Mauleverer for the Duke of York (1788) rebuilt 1848–1851
- Broadlands Ionic Portico on east front, and the major interiors (1788–1792)
- Oakley House, Bedfordshire, (1789–92)
- 44 Berkeley Square, remodelling of rooms the original architect being William Kent (c. 1790)
- Theatre Royal, Drury Lane designed the 3rd theatre (1791–1794) burnt down 1809
- Covent Garden Theatre, new auditorium (1792) burnt down 1808
- Birchmore Farm, Woburn, Bedfordshire (1792)
- The Swan Hotel, Bedford c.(1794)
- Oatlands House, Weybridge, (1794–1800)
- The Theatre, Aberdeen, Marischal Street, (1795) demolished
- Debden Hall, Uttlesford, Essex (1795) demolished 1936.
- Southill Park Southill, Bedfordshire (1796–1802)
- Park Place, Henley-on-Thames, (1796) demolished
- East India House London (1796–1800) demolished 1861–1862
- Dunira, Perthshire, (1798) demolished
- East India Warehouses, London, Middlesex Street, (1799–1800) demolished
- Wimbledon House (1800–02) demolished 1949
- Albany (London) conversion of the former Melbourne House by William Chambers into bachelor apartments (1803–1804)
- Assembly rooms, Glasgow added terminal pavilions (1807) to the building by Robert Adam, demolished 1889
- Gateway Westport, County Mayo (1807) demolished 1958
