= Peter Denys =

British drawing master, patron of the arts and landowner

Arms of Peter Denys: Argent, a cross patoncée gules between four fleurs-de-lis vert on a chief azure a greyhound courant of the field

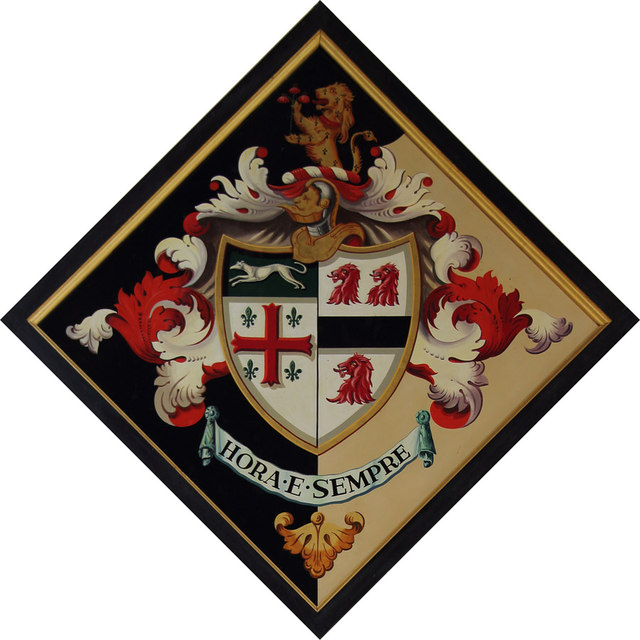
Hatchment of Peter Denys in Easton Neston Church; arms: Denys impaling Fermor

Peter Denys DL (1760 – 1816) was a British drawing master, later patron of the arts and landowner.

He was the son of the language teacher Peter Denys (sometimes Denyss), who was himself the son of a Swiss emigrant.

Denys was High Sheriff of Northamptonshire in 1812.

Denys married his pupil, Lady Charlotte Fermor (1766–1835), daughter of George Fermor, 2nd Earl of Pomfret. With her income of £4,000 a year, he bought Sloane Place in London, and Fremington, Yorkshire.

Their son was the politician, Sir George Denys, 1st Baronet (1788–1857).
