= Hans Place =

Garden square in Knightsbridge, London

Coordinates: 51°29′52″N 0°09′41″W

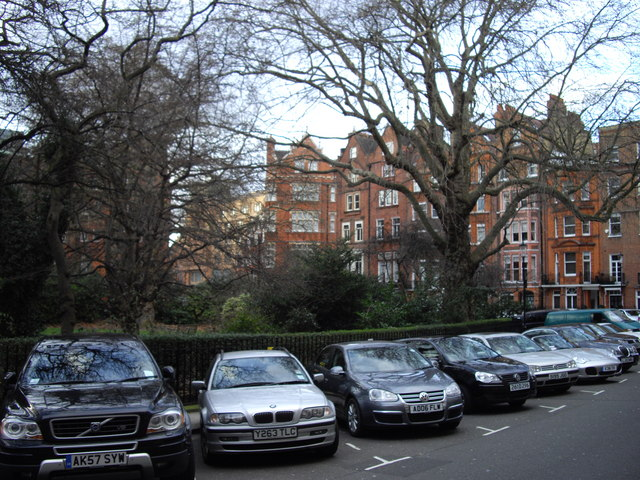
Parked cars at Hans Place (2009)

Hans Place (usually pronounced /ˈhænz/ HANZ) is a garden square in the Knightsbridge district of the Royal Borough of Kensington and Chelsea, London, immediately south of Harrods in SW1. It is named after Sir Hans Sloane, 1st Baronet, PRS (16 April 1660 – 11 January 1753), physician and collector, notable for his bequest, which became the foundation of the British Museum.

== Architecture ==
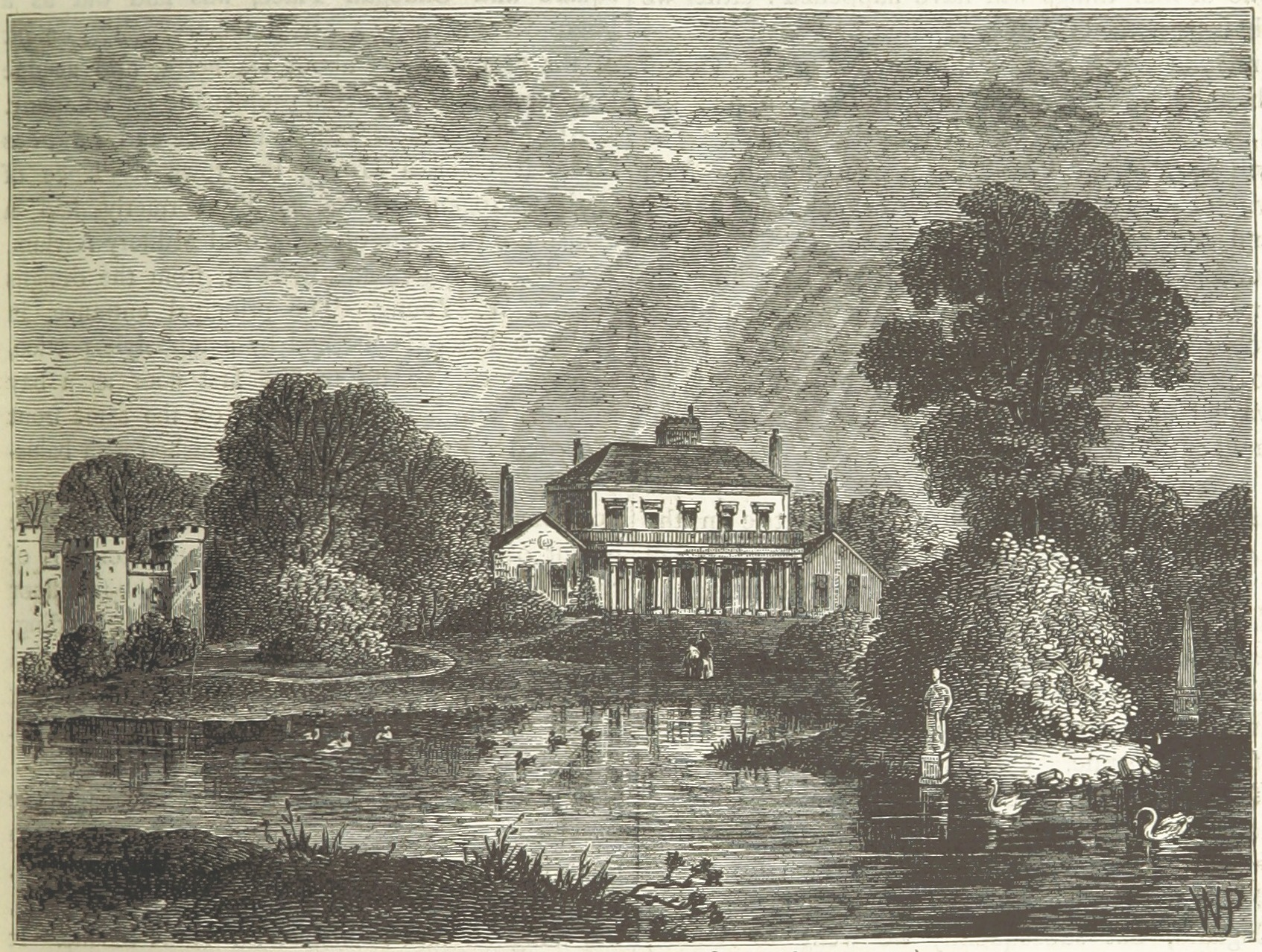
The Pavilion, Hans Place, in 1800

Hans Place dates from the 1770s, when the architect Henry Holland leased 89 acres (36 ha) from Earl Cadogan and funded the building of his house by laying out a square which he sub-let in building plots. The octagonal shape of the square is thought to have been modelled on the Place Vendôme in Paris. Horwood's Maps of 1799 and 1813 confirm that, with the exception of Nos. 55–56, all of the lots had been developed by the first edition, and that the final two houses were complete by the second.

The houses were let on 99-year leases, and apart from modernisation from time to time, appear to have remained unchanged during this period. The 1862 Ordnance Survey, for example, shows that none of the houses had been extended over the gardens, and annual directories record good tenancies with no obvious gaps during which major works might have been undertaken. Most of the 18th-century houses in Hans Place were substantially rebuilt by Cadogan Estates when new leases were arranged in the late 19th century, adopting a style that became so closely associated with the district that Osbert Lancaster dubbed it "Pont Street Dutch".

During World War II, Hans Place received bomb damage and substantial repairs were required to many buildings, and where buildings were not repairable new development took place, particularly on the Pavilion Road side. Numbers 14, 16, 17–22 and 23–27 Hans Place are all Grade II listed for their architectural merit.

== Notable residents and events ==
Jane Austen resided at 23 Hans Place in 1814–15, the home of her brother Henry Thomas Austen, while she was writing Emma (novel).

34 Hans place was the residence of William Layman from around 1816, until his death in 1826, when he left the lease to his widow, the former Elizabeth Perry, eldest surviving daughter of John Perry (shipbuilder) founder of the Blackwall Yard, whom he had married in 1798. Elizabeth Layman continued to live at 34 Hans Place until her death there in Jan 1837. As 34 Hans Place is one of only a couple of houses that are still of original construction, it is (unknowingly) William Layman's house that is used to show what Henry Austen's house would have looked.

26 Hans Place was home of Archibald Corbett, 1st Baron Rowallan and family including his daughter Hon .Elsie Cameron Corbett who became an ambulance driver in Serbia during World War I and was awarded medals by the British and Serbian governments.

22 Hans Place formed the headquarters of the 1921 Irish Treaty delegation. The delegates were Arthur Griffith, Robert Barton, and Michael Collins; Secretary to the delegation was Robert Erskine Childers, who was also Robert Barton's cousin and father of the fourth President of Ireland Erskine Hamilton Childers. At 11.15 PM on 5 December 1921, the delegates made the historic decision to recommend the treaty to the Dáil Éireann; the negotiations finally closed with the signing of the Anglo-Irish Treaty at 2.20am on 6 December 1921. Letitia Elizabeth Landon, the poet L.E.L., lived and worked on the top floor of 22 Hans Place between 1826 and 1837. She was born at No. 25 in 1802.

Hans Place was the scene of a murder in 1983, when actor Peter Arne was battered to death in his flat, apparently by an Italian vagrant who committed suicide shortly afterwards.

In the south-east corner at 17 Hans Place is the "Main School" (boys and girls aged 10–13) and headmaster's office of the notable Hill House School, where Prince Charles was a pupil. This address had been the home of George Gribble and Norah Royds, where at least one of their notable children was born, namely Phillip Gribble, according to his 1964 autobiography Off The Cuff. (Other siblings include Phyllis, later Phyllis Fordham of Ashwell Bury; Vivien Gribble, the engraver and illustrator; Lesley, mother of Frederic Seebohm, Baron Seebohm; and Julian Royds Gribble, who won a VC at the end of World War I and died of influenza in a German prison of war camp.)

== Current ==
Hans Place now represents one of the most sought after residential addresses in Chelsea. International business executives, and the super-rich, are particularly attracted to Hans Place because it is the garden square with the closest proximity to Harrods, and the best shopping in Sloane Street, Chelsea, and Belgravia.

Hans Place enjoys some of the highest levels of street security in London, being situated close to two police facilities serving nearby embassies, luxury hotels, and shopping in Knightsbridge and Chelsea and all of the private security arrangements maintained by, and for, Harrods and its customers. The communal garden is 0.4346 hectares (1.074 acres) in size and contains mature plane, chestnut, and lime trees, and various shrubs. The garden is listed Grade II on the Register of Historic Parks and Gardens. It is not open to the public.
