= Ella (name) =

- Pronunciation: /ˈɛlə/ EL-ə
- Gender: Female

Origin
- Languages: Greek, Norman, Hebrew
- Meaning: beautiful, fairy, Maiden, Goddess

Other names
- Related names: Alia, Eleanor, Elle, Ellen, Ellie

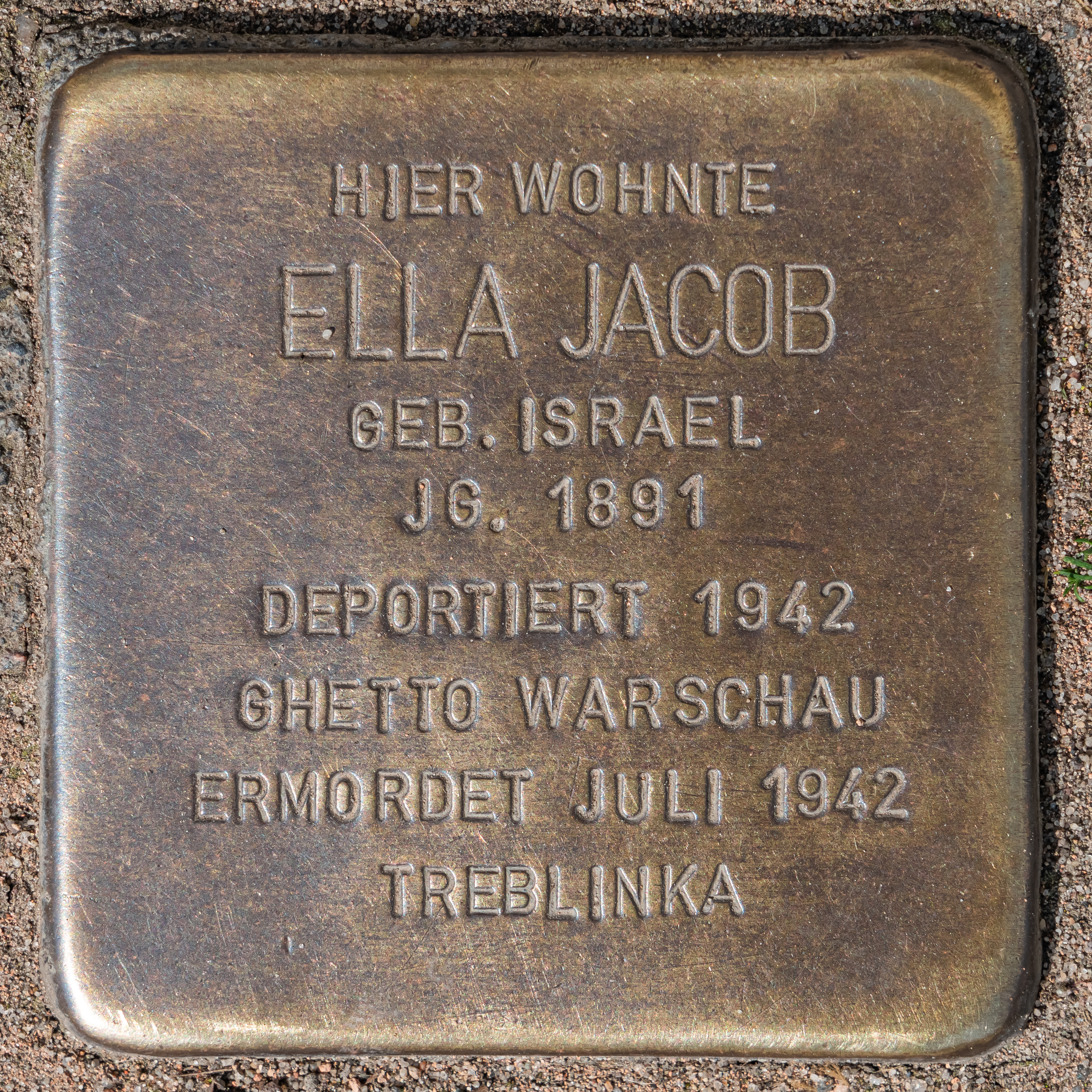
Stolperstein for an Ella Jacob, murdered in the Holocaust

Ella is a personal name most often used as a feminine given name, but also as a surname, especially in Australia. In Greek mythology, Ella (Ancient Greek: Ἕλλα) was the daughter of Athamas and Nephele. The name may be a cognate with Hellas (Ἑλλάς), the Greek name for Greece, which is said to have originally been the name of the region around Dodona.

Another source indicates that Ella is a Norman version of the Germanic short name Alia, which was short for a variety of German names with the element ali-, meaning 'other'". It is also a common short name for names starting with El-, most commonly Eleanor.

The Hebrew word Ella (אלה) has two meanings:

- A tree indigenous to the Middle East, of the pistachio family (Pistacia terebinthus). As written in Isaiah 6–13: "And though a tenth remains in the land, it will again be laid waste. But as the terebinth and oak leave stumps when they are cut down, so the holy seed will be the stump in the land."
- Ella means 'goddess' in modern Hebrew.

In English-speaking countries, Ella was popular during the Victorian era and again became popular in the late 20th and early 21st centuries. Elsewhere, the name is popular in County Kerry, Ireland, and Israel.

== People with the given name ==
=== Female ===
- Ella (Malaysian singer) (born 1966), Malaysian musician, singer, actress, model, and entrepreneur
- Princess Ella (1864–1918), German princess; wife of Grand Duke Sergei Alexandrovich of Russia
- Ella A. Bigelow (1849–1917), American author, historian, and clubwoman
- Ella A. Boole (1858–1952), American temperance movement leader and social reformer
- Ella Adayevskaya (1846–1926), Russian-German composer, pianist, and ethnomusicologist
- Ella Adoo-Kissi-Debrah (?–2013), British daughter of grassroots campaigner Rosamund Kissi-Debrah
- Ella Airlie (1882–1959), Australian librettist, dramatist, songwriter, and performer
- Ella Allan (born 2010), American actress
- Ella Al-Shamahi (born 1983), English explorer, paleoanthropologist, evolutionary biologist, writer, stand-up comic, science communicator, and television presenter
- Ella Amitay Sadovsky (born 1964), Israeli artist and physical chemist
- Ella Anderson (born 2005), American actress and singer
- Ella Anker (1870–1958), Norwegian magazine journalist, newspaper correspondent, playwright, feminist, and pamphleteer
- Ella Aquino (1902–1988), Lummi-Yakama-Puyallup civil rights activist and community organizer
- Ella Atherton (1905–1995), Scottish-born actress, fashion model, horse breeder, and Socialite
- Ella Atkins, American aerospace engineer
- Ella Auerbach (1900–1999), German-born American lawyer and social worker
- Ella Augusta (born 2006), Danish singer
- Ella B. Ensor Wilson (1838–1913), American social reformer and writer
- Ella B. Kendrick (1849–1928), American temperance activist
- Ella Baché, French pharmacist who founded the skin care brand of the same name
- Ella Baff, American artistic director
- Ella Baker (1903–1986), African American civil rights- and human rights activist
- Ella Balinska (born 1996), English actress
- Ella Ballentine (born 2001), Canadian actress
- Ella Barnwell (born 2001), Welsh track- and road cyclist
- Ella Baron, English cartoonist
- Ella Beatty (born 2000), American actress
- Ella Beere (born 1998), Australian Olympic canoeist
- Ella Bennett (2002–2007), American murder victim
- Ella Bergmann-Michel (1896–1971), German abstract artist, photographer, and documentary filmmaker
- Ella Billing (1869–1921), Swedish women's rights activist and suffragist
- Ella Blaylock Atherton (1860–1933), English-born American physician
- Ella Bleu Travolta (born 2000), American daughter of actor John Travolta
- Ella Blumenthal (born 1921), Polish-Jewish Holocaust survivor
- Ella Bohdanova (born 1996), Ukrainian acrobatic gymnast
- Ella Bohlin (born 1979), Swedish politician
- Ella Bond Johnston (1860–1951), American art administrator and educator
- Ella Boyce Kirk (c. 1861–1930), American school superintendent
- Ella Bradna (1879–1957), Bohemian-born American equestrian circus performer
- Ella Bramwell (born 1999), South Australian representative sweep-oar rower
- Ella Brantley (1864–1948), American clubwoman and civic leader
- Ella Brennan (1925–2018), American restaurateur
- Ella Briggs (1880–1977), Austrian designer and architect
- Ella Bright (born 2006), American-born British actress and singer
- Ella Brockway Avann (1853–1899), American educator and writer
- Ella Brown, several people
- Ella Bruccoleri (born 1990), English actress
- Ella Buchanan (1867–1951), American sculptor
- Ella Bucio (born 1997), Mexican traceur
- Ella Bully-Cummings (born 1958), American police officer
- Ella Campbell (1910–2003), New Zealand botanist, bryologist, and university lecturer
- Ella Campbell Scarlett (1864–1937), English physician
- Ella Cara Deloria (1889–1971), Native American educator, anthropologist, ethnographer, linguist, and novelist
- Ella Carmichael (1870–1928), Scottish editor and scholar
- Ella Casella (1858–1946), British artist, sculptor, and medalist
- Ella Castelhun (1868–1961), American architect
- Ella Catliff (born 1991), English model and blogger
- Ella Cayabyab, Filipina contestant on reality game show Pinoy Big Brother: Connect
- Ella Chafee (1945–2019), American Paralympic wheelchair basketball player and fencer
- Ella Chandler (born 2000), English cricketer
- Ella Cheever Thayer (1849–1925), American playwright and novelist
- Ella Chen (born 1981), Taiwanese singer, actress, and television host; member of girl group S.H.E
- Ella Christie (1861–1949), Scottish pioneering traveler, explorer, landowner, gardener, and author
- Ella Church Strobell (1862–1920), American cytologist and zoologist
- Ella Claridge (born 2002), English-born American cricketer
- Ella Clark (born 1992), British professional basketball- and netball player
- Ella Condie Lamb (1862–1936), American painter and stained glass artist
- Ella Connolly (born 2000), Australian sprinter
- Ella Cook (?–2025), American parishioner; victim in the 2025 Brown University shooting
- Ella Cooke (c. 1887–1917), New Zealand nurse
- Ella Cora Hind (1861–1942), Canadian journalist, agricultural expert, and women's rights activist
- Ella Corfield (1894–1986), British pharmacist
- Ella Cruz (born 1996), Filipina actress, product endorser, host, commercial- and promotional model, and dancer
- Ella D. Barrier (c. 1852–1945), American educator and clubwoman
- Ella D. Crawford (1852–1932), American temperance movement community organizer
- Ella Daish, British environmental activist
- Ella Dawn Jenkins, real name of EllaHarp (born 1988/1989), American harpist and singer
- Ella de Jesus (born 1993), Filipina professional volleyball player
- Ella Dederick (born 1996), American professional soccer player
- Ella Dee Kessel Caperton (1943–2000), American politician
- Ella del Rosario, Spanish-Filipina American singer, actress, and celebrity
- Ella Demmink Koeze (1905–1986), American member of the Constitutional group Con-Con Eleven
- Ella Diehl (born 1978), Russian Olympic badminton player
- Ella Dietz (1847–1920), American actress and author
- Ella Ding, Australian beautician; contestant on Married at First Sight (Australian TV series) season 9
- Ella Donnison (born 1975), English former cricketer
- Ella Donovan, English Communist activist
- Ella Du Cane (1874–1943), English painter and illustrator
- Ella Dzelzainis, British historian and academic
- Ella E. Clark (1896–1984), American educator, writer, and professor emerita of English
- Ella E. McBride (1862–1965), American fine-art photographer, mountain climber, and centenarian
- Ella Eastin (born 1997), American retired swimmer
- Ella Eaton Kellogg (1853–1920), American philanthropist, dietitian, academic, suffragist, essayist, magazine editor, and human rights activist
- Ella Edmondson (born 1986), English singer-songwriter
- Ella Ehlers (1904–1985), German Kindergarten teacher, activist, and politician
- Ella Eklund (1894–1953), Swedish Olympic diver
- Ella Elgar (1869–1945), New Zealand Socialite, entrepreneur, and art collector
- Ella Elvira Gibson (1821–1901), American Union Army military chaplain, abolitionist, poet, human rights activist, feminist writer, and lecturer
- Ella Emhoff (born 1999), American model, artist, fashion designer, and LGBTQ rights activist
- Ella Endlich (born 1984), German singer and dancer
- Ella Ensink (1897–1968), German film editor
- Ella Envy (born 2000), American professional wrestler
- Ella Eronen (1900–1987), Finnish actress and poetic reciter
- Ella Ewing (1872–1913), American circus performer with gigantism
- Ella Eyre (born 1994), English singer and songwriter
- Ella F. Boyd (c. 1855–after 1910, American educator and geologist
- Ella Fajardo (born 2003), Filipina college basketball player
- Ella Farman (1837–1907), American children's literature writer and editor
- Ella Feingold, American session guitarist, orchestrator, composer, and music producer
- Ella Ferris Pell (1846–1922), American painter, sculptor, and illustrator
- Ella Fillmore Lillie (1884–1972), American visual artist
- Ella Fitzgerald (1917–1996), American jazz singer, songwriter, composer, and bandleader
- Ella Flagg Young (1845–1918), American educator, trade unionist, human rights activist, writer, and suffragette
- Ella Florence Fonden (1880–1982), American philanthropist
- Ella Fontanals-Cisneros, Cuban-born American philanthropist and art collector
- Ella Frances Braman (1850–?), American lawyer and businesswoman
- Ella Freeman Sharpe (1875–1947), British psychoanalyst
- Ella Friend (born 2003), Australian AFLW player
- Ella Fry (1916–1997), Western Australian artist and musician
- Ella Fuller Maitland (1857–1939), British novelist and poet
- Ella G. Sonkin (1903–1984), American folklorist, folk dance organizer, and educator
- Ella Gaines Yates (1927–2006), American librarian
- Ella Gálová (born 2004), French-Slovak professional squash player
- Ella Geisman, alternate name of June Allyson (1917–2006), American stage-, film-, and television actress
- Ella George, Australian politician
- Ella German (born 1937), American friend of assassin Lee Harvey Oswald
- Ella Germein, South Australian member of pop band Germein
- Ella Gibbons (born 1994), Scottish netball player
- Ella Gibson (born 2000), British archer
- Ella Gifft (c. 1882–1964), African-American educator, businesswoman, and suffragist
- Ella Giles Ruddy (1851–1917), American author and editor
- Ella Giselle, American television personality, actress, and transgender rights activist
- Ella Gjømle Berg (born 1979), Norwegian cross-country skier
- Ella Gmeiner (1874–1954), German opera mezzo soprano singer
- Ella Goldsmith (born 1997/1998), Australian rugby union referee, and former rugby union footballer
- Ella Gombaszögi (1894–1951), Hungarian actress
- Ella Graham Agnew (1871–1958), American educator and social worker
- Ella Grasso (1919–1981), American politician
- Ella Graubart (1896–1982), American lawyer
- Ella Greenslade (born 1997), New Zealand Olympic rower
- Ella Greenwood (born 2001), English filmmaker, actress, writer, and mental health activist
- Ella Gross (born 2008), American singer, model, and actress; member of South Korean girl group Meovv
- Ella Gudrun Ingeborg Holleufer (1906–1954), Danish spouse of Prime Minister Hans Hedtoft
- Ella Guevara (born 1998), Filipina former actress
- Ella Gunson (born 1989), New Zealand field hockey player
- Ella Guru (born 1966), American-born English painter and musician
- Ella Haddad (born 1978), Australian politician
- Ella Häkkinen, Finnish kart racer; daughter of former racing driver Mika Häkkinen
- Ella Halikas, American model, social media personality, and body positivity activist
- Ella Hall (1897–1981), American actress
- Ella Halman (1906–1995), English opera singer and actress
- Ella Halvarsson (born 1999), Swedish biathlete
- Ella Hamilton Durley (ca. 1852–1922), American educator, newspaper editor, and journalist
- Ella Harper (1870–1921), American circus performer
- Ella Harris (born 1998), New Zealand former professional racing cyclist
- Ella Hase (born 2002), American NWSL player
- Ella Hattan (1860–1924), American fencer and actress
- Ella Havelka (born 1989), Indigenous Australian ballet dancer
- Ella Hayward (born 2003), Australian WBBL- and WNCL player
- Ella Heads (born 2003), Australian AFLW player
- Ella Heide (1871–1956), Danish painter
- Ella Henderson (born 1996), English singer and songwriter
- Ella Henry (born 1954), New Zealand Maōri academic and professor
- Ella Hepworth Dixon (1857–1932), English writer, novelist, and editor
- Ella Hickson (born 1985), English playwright, theatrical director, writer, and university teacher
- Ella Hill Hutch (1923–1981), American politician
- Ella Virginia Houck Holloway (1862–1940), American socialite and clubwoman
- Ella Holm Bull (1929–2006), Southern Sámi teacher and author
- Ella Holmes White (1856–1942), American Titanic survivor
- Ella Hooper (born 1983), Australian rock music singer-songwriter, radio presenter, and television personality
- Ella Hose (born 2005), Australian Paralympic athlete with cerebral palsy
- Ella Howard Estill (1860–1941), American botanical illustrator
- Ella Huber (born 2002), American PWHL player
- Ella Hudson Gasking (1891–1966), English businesswoman, industrialist, and engineer
- Ella Hunt (born 1998), English actress and singer-songwriter
- Ella Hval (1904–1994), Norwegian actress, instructor, and teacher
- Ella Ilbak (1895–1997), Estonian dancer and writer
- Ella J. Bradley-Hughley (1889–1918), American choir director and soprano singer
- Ella Jane (born 2001), American singer-songwriter
- Ella Jansen (born 2005), Canadian Olympic swimmer
- Ella Jay Basco (born 2006), American actress and singer
- Ella Jean Canfield (1919–2000), Canadian politician
- Ella Jean Hill, birth name of Jean Chaudhuri (1937–1997), American community leader, activist, and author
- Ella Jenkins (1924–2024), American folk- and children's music singer-songwriter, and centenarian
- Ella Johnson (1919–2004), American jazz- and R&B singer
- Ella Jones (born 1955), American chromatographer, pastor, and mayor
- Ella Jones (swimmer) (born 2000), Australian Paralympic swimmer
- Ella Joyce (born 1954), American actress
- Ella Junnila (born 1998), Finnish Olympic high jumper
- Ella Kaabachi (born 1992), French-Tunisian international footballer
- Ella Kaiser Carruth (1881–1974), American librarian and writer
- Ella Kalsbeek (born 1955), Dutch former politician
- Ella Kamanya (1961–2005), Namibian politician and businesswoman
- Ella Kam Oon Chun (1915–1979), Asian American journalist and editor
- Ella Kanninen, Finnish hostess on reality television show Tanssii tähtien kanssa
- Ella Kay (1895–1988), German mayor and resistance activist
- Ella Kenion (born 1968), English actress
- Ella King (disambiguation), several people
- Ella Kivikoski (1901–1990), Finnish archaeologist
- Ella Knowles Haskell (1860–1911), American lawyer, suffragist, and politician
- Ella Koblo Gulama (1921–2006), Sierra Leone politician
- Ella Koon (born 1979), Hong Kong former singer, and actress and model
- Ella Koster (born 2005), Australian NRLW player
- Ella Kovacs (born 1964), Romanian retired Olympic middle-distance runner
- Ella Kruglyanskaya (born 1978), Latvian painter
- Ella Laboriel (born 1949), Mexican singer and film- and television actress
- Ella Langley (born 1999), American country music singer-songwriter
- Ella Latham (1878–1964), Australian charity worker and hospital administrator
- Ella-Lee Lahav (born 2003), Israeli singer
- Ella Leffland (1931–2024), American novelist and short story writer
- Ella Leivo (born 1994), Finnish tennis player
- Ella Lemhagen (born 1965), Swedish film director and screenwriter
- Ella Lewis (1878–1953), American educator and politician
- Ella Leya, Azerbaijani-born American composer, singer, and writer
- Ella Lillian Wall Van Leer (1892–1986), American artist, architect, and women's rights activist
- Ella Lily Hyland (born 1998), Irish actress
- Ella Lindley, English daughter of entrepreneur and children's welfare campaigner Paul Lindley
- Ella Lindow, birth name of Gabrielle Wodnil (1880–1933), British novelist and songwriter
- Ella Lingens (1908–2002), Austrian physician
- Ella Little-Collins (1914–1996), American civil rights activist; half-sister of African-American revolutionary- and Black nationalist leader Malcolm X
- Ella Littwitz (born 1982), Israeli artist
- Ella Lloyd (born 2005), Welsh racing driver
- Ella Logan (1913–1969), Scottish-born American actress and singer
- Ella Lola (1883–?), American vaudeville dancer
- Ella Lonn (1879–1962), African American scholar of the American Civil War
- Ella Lonsdale (born 2007), English boxer
- Ella Loraine Dorsey (1853–1935), American author, journalist, and translator
- Ella Louise Stokes Hunter (?–1988), American mathematics educator
- Ella Lyman Cabot (1866–1934), American philosopher of ethics for children, and educator, lecturer, and writer
- Ella Lynch, several people
- Ella M. George (1850–1938), American teacher, lecturer, and social reformer
- Ella M. S. Marble (1850–1929), American journalist, educator, activist, and physician
- Ella Macknight (1904–1997), Australian obstetrician and gynecologist
- Ella Maclean-Howell (born 2004), Welsh Olympic mountain bike cross-country cyclist
- Ella MacMahon (1864–1956), Irish romance novelist
- Ella Mae (disambiguation), several people
- Ella Mahammitt (1863–1932), American journalist, civil rights activist, and women's rights activist
- Ella Mai (born 1994), English R&B singer and songwriter
- Ella Maillart (1903–1997), Swiss adventurer, travel writer, photographer, and sportswoman
- Ella Maisy Purvis (born 2003), English actress
- Ella Manning (1906–2007), Canadian nurse, Arctic explorer, writer, naturalist, and centenarian
- Ella Mäntynen, real name of Goldielocks (born 2001), Finnish singer and songwriter
- Ella Marchment (born 1992), British opera director, artistic director, and associate professor
- Ella Margaret McEwan (?–2011), New Zealand spouse of civil engineer Colin McLeod (engineer)
- Ella Margaret Gibson (1894–1964), American stage- and silent-film actress
- Ella Maria Ballou (1852–1937), American stenographer, reporter, essayist, and educator
- Ella Marie Hætta Isaksen (born 1998), Norwegian Sámi singer, songwriter, environmentalist, activist, and actress
- Ella Marija Lani Yelich-O'Connor, real name of Lorde (born 1996), New Zealand singer-songwriter
- Ella Mary (disambiguation), several people
- Ella Masar (born 1986), American former NWSL player
- Ella Mastrantonio (born 1992), Australian soccer player
- Ella Matteucci (born 1993), Canadian baseball and ice hockey player
- Ella May (disambiguation), several people
- Ella McCaleb (1856–1933), American college dean
- Ella McCaughan (born 2002), English cricketer
- Ella McDonald (born 2005), British tennis player
- Ella McFadyen (1887–1976), Australian poet, journalist, and children's writer
- Ella McSweeney (born 1978), Irish food- and farming journalist and reporter
- Ella McWilliams Chamberlain (1848–1934), American women's rights activist and journalist
- Ella Meek (born 2005), English environmentalist and writer
- Ella Mensch (1859–1935), German writer, journalist, teacher, feminist, and editor
- Ella Mielniczenko, American former wife of Internet personality, comedian, author, cook, and actress Hannah Hart
- Ella Mikkola (born 2007), Finnish high jumper
- Ella Milch-Sheriff (born 1954), Israeli musician and classical opera composer
- Ella Millar (1869–1959), Scottish politician
- Ella Mills (born 1991), English food writer, blogger, diet advocate, and businesswoman
- Ella Mitchell (1935–2024), American soul singer and actress
- Ella Molnár (1906–1990), Hungarian Olympic swimmer
- Ella Morgan (1876–1958), American school librarian
- Ella Morgan (television personality) (born 1993), English television personality, presenter, model, and campaigner
- Ella Morris (born 2002), English professional footballer
- Ella N. McLean, Countess Norraikow (1853/1858–1913), Canadian author and metaphysician
- Ella Henrietta Davidson Morrison (1851–1939), American philanthropist
- Ella Naper (1886–1972), English jeweler, potter, designer, and painter
- Ella Negruzzi (1876–1948), Romanian lawyer and women's rights activist
- Ella Nelson (born 1994), Australian former Olympic sprinter
- Ella Némethy (1891–1961), Hungarian mezzo-soprano singer
- Ella Newton (born 2000), Australian actress
- Ella Nicholas (born 1990), Cook Islands Olympic slalom canoeist
- Ella Norcross (1854–1923), American painter
- Ella Ochoa (born 1945), American advocate for migrant workers and disabled people
- Ella O'Grady (born 2005), Australian soccer player
- Ella O'Neill (1857–1922), American mother of playwright Eugene O'Neill
- Ella O'Neill (screenwriter), American screenwriter
- Ella Onojuvwevwo (born 2005), Nigerian Olympic sprinter
- Ella Ottey (born 2005), Canadian international soccer player
- Ella P. Stewart (1893–1987), American pharmacist
- Ella Palis (born 1999), French professional footballer
- Ella Pamfilova (born 1953), Russian politician
- Ella Pardy (born 1990), Australian Paralympic athlete with cerebral palsy
- Ella Park Lawrence (1857–1924), American community leader, philanthropist, and state advocate
- Ella Payne Moran (1898–1985), American educator and clubwoman
- Ella Pearson Mitchell (1917–2008), African-American Baptist minister, preacher, educator, and author
- Ella Peaters (1907–1991), Norwegian actress, revue artist, singer, and circus performer
- Ella Peddemors (born 2002), Dutch professional footballer
- Ella Phillips Crandall (1871–1938), American nurse
- Ella Pilcher (1863/1864–1939), English aviator, aeronautical engineer, and nurse
- Ella Pirrie (1857–1929), Irish nurse
- Ella Polyakova (born 1941), Russian human rights activist
- Ella Pontefract (1896–1945), British social historian
- Ella Powell (born 2000), Welsh footballer
- Ella Purnell (born 1996), English actress
- Ella R. Frank (1900–1988), British contralto- and mezzo-soprano opera singer
- Ella Rae, several people
- Ella Raines (1920–1988), American film- and television actress
- Ella Ramsay (born 2004), Australian Olympic swimmer
- Ella Rappich (born 2000), South African-born Swedish actress
- Ella Ratilainen (born 1997), Finnish aesthetic group gymnast
- Ella Reeve Bloor (1862–1951), American labor organizer and Socialist- and Communist activist
- Ella Retford (1885–1962), English music hall comedian, singer, dancer, and actress
- Ella Rhoads Higginson (c. 1862–1940), American poet and author
- Ella Richards, American-born English model
- Ella Riegel (1867–1937), American suffragist and women's rights activist
- Ella Road (born 1991), British screenwriter, playwright, writer, and actress
- Ella Roberts (born 2004), Australian AFLW player
- Ella Rodman Church (1831–1912), American writer of fiction, children's literature, and books about homemaking
- Ella Rose Curtois (1860–1944), English sculptor
- Ella Ross (born 1992), Australian AFLW player
- Ella Rothschild (born 1984), Israeli choreographer, dancer, and multidisciplinary artist
- Ella Rubin (born 2001), American actress
- Ella Rumpf (born 1995), Swiss actress
- Ella Russell (1868/1869–1956), American suffragette, businesswoman, and politician
- Ella Rutherford (born 2000), English footballer
- Ella Sabljak (born 1991), Australian Paralympic wheelchair basketball- and rugby player
- Ella Sachs Plotz (1888–1922), American philanthropist
- Ella Sanchez (born 2005), American-born Mexican professional footballer
- Ella Scoble Opperman (1873–1969), American pianist, organist, and educator
- Ella Seaver Owen (1852–1910), American painter and teacher
- Ella Seidel (born 2005), German professional tennis player
- Ella Sekatau (1928–2014), Native American poet, historian, ethnohistorian, and medicine woman
- Ella Sergeyeva (1935–2024), Soviet rower
- Ella Shado-Shechtman, Israeli military personnel
- Ella Shaw, Southern Australian politician
- Ella Shelton (born 1998), Canadian PWHL player
- Ella Sheppard (1851–1914), American soprano, pianist, composer, and arranger of spirituals
- Ella Shields (1879–1952), English music hall singer, parodist, and drag king
- Ella Shohat (born 1959), Israeli-American professor, writer, and cultural theorist
- Ella Simmons, American Seventh-day Adventist administrator and educator
- Ella Simon (1902–1981), Australian Aboriginal activist
- Ella Simpson (born 2002), American soccer player
- Ella Smith, several people
- Ella Snyder, 19th- and 20th-century American actress
- Ella Sophia Armitage (1841–1931), English historian and archaeologist
- Ella Sophonisba Hergesheimer (1873–1943), American illustrator, painter, and printmaker
- Ella Spicer (1876–1958), New Zealand visual artist
- Ella Spira, English composer, visual artist, and theatre producer
- Ella St. Clair Thompson (1870–1944), American suffragist, attorney, and mica mining company owner
- Ella Stack (1929–2023), Australian medical doctor and mayor
- Ella Sterling Mighels (1853–1934), American pioneer, author, and literary historian
- Ella Stevens (born 1997), American NWSL player
- Ella Stevens (racing driver) (born 2006), English racing driver
- Ella Stewart Udall (1855–1937), American telegraphist and entrepreneur
- Ella Stuart Carson (1880–?), American screenwriter
- Ella Suitiala (born 1989), Finnish Olympic snowboarder
- Ella Sykes (1863–1939), British writer, traveler, and photographer
- Ella Telford (born 1999), English cricketer
- Ella Tengbom-Velander (1921–2022), Swedish politician
- Ella Thomas (born 1981), Eritrean-American actress, model, and film producer
- Ella Tiritiello (born 2006), Swedish singer and actress
- Ella Toone (born 1999), English professional footballer
- Ella Touon (born 2003), Swiss international footballer
- Ella Trebe (1902–1943), German factory worker and anti-government resistance activist
- Ella Tripp (born 1976), English Olympic badminton player
- Ella Tromp-Yarzagaray (born 1944), Aruban former politician
- Ella Trout (1896–1952), English fisherwoman
- Ella Tvrdková (1878–1918), Czech opera singer
- Ella Tyree (1920–1989), American medical researcher
- Ella Ungermann (1891–1921), Danish stage actress
- Ella Uphay Mowry (1865–1923), American politician, suffragist, and women's rights activist
- Ella V. Aldrich Schwing (1902–1982), American librarian, professor, and pioneer of library user instruction
- Ella van Heemstra (1900–1984), Dutch noblewoman, Socialite, and volunteer worker; mother of actress Audrey Hepburn
- Ella Van Kerkhoven (born 1993), Belgian professional footballer
- Ella van Poucke (born 1994), Dutch classical cellist
- Ella Vanhanen (born 1993), Finnish former footballer
- Ella Viana de Holanda, real name of Ella (Brazilian singer) (born 1997), Brazilian singer and songwriter
- Ella Viitasuo (born 1996), Finnish SDHL player
- Ella Vogelaar (1949–2019), Dutch politician and trade union leader
- Ella Vos, American pop singer-songwriter
- Ella Waldek (1929–2013), American professional wrestler
- Ella Washington (born 1943), American former R&B- and gospel singer
- Ella Washington (author), American professor and author
- Ella Watson (1860–1889), American rancher
- Ella Watson (1883–1980), American janitor and charwoman
- Ella Webb (1877–1946), Irish pediatrician
- Ella Weed (1853–1894), American educator
- Ella Wesner (1841–1917), American male impersonator and vaudeville performer
- Ella Wheeler Wilcox (1850–1919), American poet and author
- Ella Wiebe (born 1978), German-born New Zealand association footballer
- Ella Williams (disambiguation), several people
- Ella Willis, British contestant on structured-reality TV series Made in Chelsea
- Ella Wilson (born 2003), Australian cricketer
- Ella Winter (1898–1980), Australian-British journalist and activist
- Ella Wintler (1885–1975), American politician
- Ella Wolfe (1896–2000), Ukrainian-born American political activist and educator
- Ella Wood (born 2001), Australian retired AFLW player
- Ella Wyllie (born 2002), New Zealand professional racing cyclist
- Ella Wyrwas (born 1999), English rugby union player
- Ella Young (1867–1956), Irish-born American poet and Celtic mythologist
- Ella Zeller (1933–2025), Romanian table tennis player, coach, and administrator

=== Male ===
- Ella Amida, 4th-century African monarch
- Ella Asbeha, 6th-century Ethiopian monarch and Christian saint
- Ella Fitzgerald (drag queen) (born c. 1955), American drag queen
- Ella Lamoureux, Canadian drag queen on Call Me Mother season 1
- Ella Vaday (born 1988), English drag queen, actor, and dancer

== People with the surname ==
- Armand Ken Ella (born 1993), Cameroonian footballer
- Gary Ella (born 1960), Australian former rugby union player
- Glen Ella (born 1959), Australian former rugby union player and coach
- John Ella (1802–1888), English classical violinist and director of concerts
- Krishna Ella (born 1969), Indian scientist and entrepreneur
- Marcia Ella-Duncan (born 1963), Indigenous Australian former netball player
- Mark Ella (born 1959), Indigenous Australian former rugby union footballer
- Norman Ella (1910–1987), Australian Olympic rowing coxswain
- Steve Ella (born 1960), Australian former rugby league footballer
- Suchitra Ella, Indian business executive; CEO and co-founder of biotechnology company Bharat Biotech

== Fictional characters ==
- Ella, in the 1997 US novel Ella Enchanted; played by Anne Hathaway (as adult Ella) and Aimee Brigg (as young Ella) in the 2004 jukebox musical fantasy comedy film
- Ella Ashford, in the UK medical drama series Casualty, played by Tahirah Sharif
- Ella Bella, in the pre-school animated TV series Ella Bella Bingo; voiced by Summer Fontana in the 2020 Norwegian 3D animated adventure comedy film
- Ella Blake, in the US science fiction TV series Fringe, played by Emily Meade
- Ella Cesaire, in the French animated superhero TV series Miraculous: Tales of Ladybug & Cat Noir, voiced by Cherami Leigh (English) and Marie Nonnenmacher (French)
- Ella Cinders, in the US syndicated comic strip Ella Cinders; played by Colleen Moore in the 1926 US silent comedy film
- Ella Dee, in the UK TV programme Hex, played by Laura Pyper
- Ella Forster, in the UK TV soap opera Emmerdale, played by Paula Lane
- Ella Hart, in the UK TV soap opera Emmerdale, played by Corrinne Wicks
- Ella Hunter, in the Australian TV soap opera Home and Away, played by Zoe Littler, Indya Bottomsley, Paris Steen, Matina Commes, Toby Wormer, and Jack Thompson
- Ella Mental, in the US animated TV series Yin Yang Yo!, voiced by Linda Ballantyne
- Ella Minnow Pea, in the 2001 US novel Ella Minnow Pea
- Ella Perea, in the 2009 Philippine TV drama fantasy series Jim Fernandez's Kambal sa Uma, played by Melissa Ricks
- Ella Richardson, in the UK soap opera Hollyoaks, played by Erin Palmer
- Ella Robson, in the UK medical soap opera Doctors, played by Lily-Mae Evans
- Ella Simms, in the US drama TV series Melrose Place, played by Katie Cassidy
- Ella Sterling, in the US Marvel Comics

== See also ==
- Matronymic
- Ella (disambiguation)
