= Catliff =

Catliff is a surname. Notable people with the surname include:

- Ella Catliff (born 1991), model and blogger
- John Catliff (born 1965), Canadian soccer player
