= Sonkin =

Sonkin is a surname. Notable people with the surname include:

- Ella G. Sonkin (1903–1984), American folklorist
- François Sonkin (1922–2010), French writer
- Robert Sonkin (1910–1980), American scholar of speech, language and music
