= Mary Waller =

Mary Waller may refer to:

- Mary Ella Waller (1855–1938), American writer and educator
- Mary Lemon Waller (1851–1931), British portrait painter
