= Mary Ella =

Disambiguation name page

Mary Ella is a feminine given name. Notable people with the name include:

- Mary "Molly" Ella Bakewell (1868–1960), American suffragist, author, and social activist
- Mary Ella Dees (1911–2005), American stage- and screen actress
- Mary Ella Kirby Berry (1916–1957), Indian medical missionary
- Mary Ella Milham (1922–2010), American-Canadian professor of Latin and Greek
- Mary Ella Mossell (1853–1886), American African Methodist Episcopal missionary in Haiti
- Mary Ella Waller (1855–1938), American writer and educator

== See also ==
- Ella Mary
