= Ella Mary =

Ella Mary may refer to:

- Ella Mary Collin (1903–1973), British metallurgist and educationist
- Ella Mary Edghill (1881–1964), British translator and teacher
- Ella Mary Leather (1874–1928), English collector of folklore and songs

== See also ==
- Mary Ella
