= Gate of the Hills =

Historic house in Vermont, United States

- U.S. National Register of Historic Places
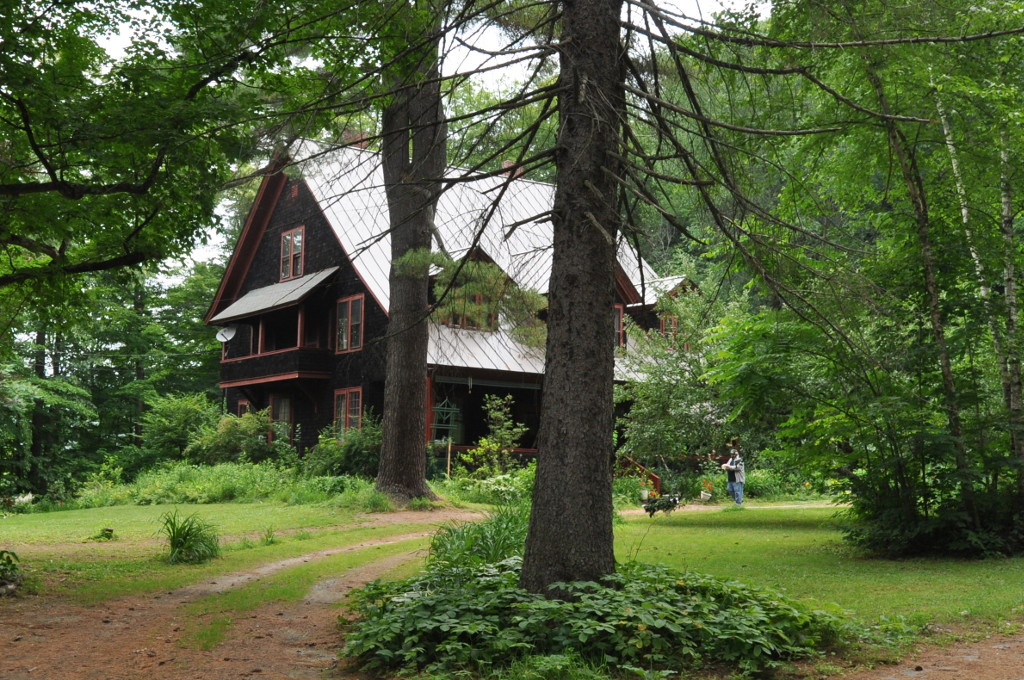

- Location within Vermont
- Location: Jct. of North and Royalton Hill Rds., Bethel, Vermont
- Coordinates: 43°49′15″N 72°37′50″W
- Area: 1.5 acres (0.61 ha)
- Built: 1896
- Architectural style: Colonial Revival, Shingle Style
- NRHP reference No.: 91001648
- Added to NRHP: November 18, 1991

The Gate of the Hills is a historic house at North and Royalton Hill Roads in Bethel, Vermont. Built about 1896, it was until 1918 home to Mary E. Waller, a prolific novelist and essayist of the early 20th century. The house is a distinctive early example of Dutch Colonial Revival architecture, probably based on designs originating in the Netherlands. It was listed on the National Register of Historic Places in 1991.

== Description and history ==
The Gate of the Hills stands at the southern fringe of a residential area south of Bethel village. It is set on a small level area north of the junction of North and Royalton Hill Roads, in a small clearing in the woods with a semicircular drive in front. The house is 2 1/2 stories in height, with a massive stone foundation (apparently intended to support masonry walls) and a wooden frame clad in shingles. The roof has gables at the side, and its front slope extends down to the first floor, where it shelters a recessed porch, and has three large gabled dormers above. On the rear, the roof extends only to the top of the second floor, and is slightly flared (a Dutch Colonial feature) at the base.

The house was built about 1896 for Mary E. Waller and her mother; its designer and builder are not known. Waller made this her primary residence until 1918, and it was here that she wrote some of her best-known works, including the 1904 The Wood-carver o£ 'Lympus, which is set in Bethel. Although she did not write directly about the house, she occasionally wrote about its surrounding environment. The house itself is an unusual combination of American Shingle style architecture, with a number of distinctive features presaging the later Dutch Colonial Revival.

== See also ==
- National Register of Historic Places listings in Windsor County, Vermont
