= Ella King =

Topics referred to by the same term

Ella King may refer to:

- Ella King Newsom (1833–1919), American Confederate nurse during the American Civil War
- Ella King Russell Torrey (1925–2020), American public information officer, editor, and human rights activist; mother of Ella King Torrey
- Ella King Torrey (1957–2003), American academic administrator, professional fundraiser, arts advocate, and art historian

See also:

- Torrey Quilt Collection, a collection of African-American quilts that Ella King Torrey procured
