= Ella King Newsom =

- Born: 1838; Brandon, Mississippi
- Died: January 18, 1919 (aged 80–81)
- Occupation: Nurse

Ella King Newsom (1833–1919; also known as Ella King Newsome) was a nurse for the Confederacy in the American Civil War. She earned the nickname of the "Florence Nightingale of the South." Newsom served as he matron of Chattanooga's Academy Hospital, working on the front in Tennessee from 1861–1862. Newsom also served at the Corinth House Hotel Hospital with Kate Cumming.

== Pre-war life ==
Ella King Newsom was born in Brandon, Mississippi, in 1838 to Julia and Thomas S. N. King. Her father—T.S.King—was a Baptist minister; she was the second of seven children. The family, soon after Ella King's birth, moved to Arkansas, where she spent most of her young life. In 1854, King married Dr. Frank Newsom from Tennessee, a wealthy physician and planter. After his death a few years later, Newsom inherited his estate. Newsom, her younger sisters, and other young women lived in a house together in Tennessee while attending Mary Sharp College.

== Civil War service ==
Newson's war experience began with her buying supplies with her own money and assisting the Southern Mothers' Home Hospital and the Overton Hospital. Following where the need for help was, Newsom soon relocated to Kentucky, working grueling hours to make up for the need. Newsom's work continued to move her around the south, eventually earning her a position as a matron for the Foard Hospital in Chattanooga, Tennessee. Newsom continued working in numerous locations until the end of the war.

== Post-war life ==
Newsom spent the entirety of her wealth during the war on supplies and supporting the medical effort. She remarried to Confederate veteran Colonel W.H. Trader in 1867. The two had one surviving child, Mary. Newsom died of an illness on January 18, 1919.
