= Ella Washington (author) =

American professor and author

Ella F. Washington is an American professor and author who works in the field of DEI. As of 2024, she is a professor at Georgetown University’s McDonough School of Business. Washington's books include The Necessary Journey: Making Real Progress on Equity and Inclusion and Unspoken: A Guide to Cracking the Hidden Corporate Code.

Washington is a graduate of Spelman College and received her PhD in 2014 from the Kellogg School of Management at Northwestern University.
