= Ella Kaiser Carruth =

American librarian and writer

Ella Boynton Kaiser Carruth
- Born: January 5, 1881; Cleveland, Ohio, United States
- Died: March 13, 1974 (aged 93); Winter Park, Florida, United States
- Education: Smith College, Flora Stone Mather College, Western Reserve University
- Occupation(s): Librarian, writer
- Notable work: She Wanted To Read
- Spouse: William M. Carruth

Ella Boynton Kaiser Carruth (January 5, 1881 – March 13, 1974) was an American librarian and writer. She wrote the children's novel She Wanted To Read in 1966.

== Early life ==
Carruth was born in 1881 in Cleveland, Ohio. She attended Flora Stone Mather College and Western Reserve University which are both in Ohio. She received a Bachelor of Arts degree from Smith College in Northampton, Massachusetts, in 1903. In 1907, Carruth married mathematics professor William M. Carruth, who taught at Hamilton College in Clinton, New York. She worked for the Kirkland Library in Clinton as a part of the Board of Trustees and helped lead the creation of the library's Historical Room. She wrote for many publications including the Journal of Home Economics and Yankee. She sometimes wrote under the pen name Delane Heath.

After her husband died in 1943, Carruth moved to Winter Park, Florida, in Alabama to live at a hotel. While in Winter Park, she worked as a part of the Winter Park Library and the Science Library at Rollins College.

== Career and death ==
Carruth wrote the 1966 children's novel She Wanted To Read which is based on the life of American educator Mary McLeod Bethune. The novel was published when Carruth was 85 years old. She Wanted To Read has been taught in American schools as part of the curriculum. She wrote for magazines including Table Talk, Best Years, and Science Digest. Her planned second novel The Education of Zora Neale Hurston was rejected by publishers. Carruth died on March 13, 1974, and was buried in Clinton, New York.
