= Ella Rothschild =

Choreographer and dancer

- Born: 1984 (age 41–42)
- Website: ellarothschild.com

Ella Rothschild (born 1984) is a choreographer, dancer, and multidisciplinary artist. She is known for her experimental dance-theatre works presented by international companies including Batsheva Dance Company, Opera Ballet Vlaanderen, and Nederlands Dans Theater.

== Early life and career ==
Rothschild was born in Israel. She began her career performing with the Inbal Pinto and Avshalom Pollak Dance Company, and later joined Batsheva Dance Company under the artistic direction of Ohad Naharin.

Rothschild is a dancer with Kidd Pivot, the contemporary dance‐theatre company led by choreographer Crystal Pite.

She performed in Revisor (2019), a hybrid dance-theatre production by Kidd Pivot choreographed by Crystal Pite and Jonathon Young. In the ensemble of eight dancers, she was noted in reviews as “a standout villain as Minister Desouza.”

Rothschild has performed in Assembly Hall (2023). A dance-theatre hybrid by Kidd Pivot that premiered at DanceHouse in Vancouver before touring internationally.

== Choreographic works ==
In 2021, Rothschild created a trilogy of works for Batsheva Dance Company: Summer Snow, On the Edge of Nowhere, and A Year Without Summer.

During a residency, Rothschild developed the dance-film Pigulim, which was presented as part of Baryshnikov Arts Center’s digital season in late 2021.

In 2023, Rothschild reinterpreted Petrushka for Opera Ballet Vlaanderen, relocating the classic ballet’s setting to a wilderness landscape.

In 2024, Rothschild created a new piece titled This Solution in The Hague. The work premiered on 5 July 2024. According to NDT, the piece explored characters inhabiting inherited objects, each carrying emotional weight and forming a narrative of resistance, dissolution, and collective unity.

In 2026, Rothschild was the choreographer for Luca Guadagnino's production of John Adams's The Death of Klinghoffer, conducted by Lawrence Renes, at the Maggio Musicale Fiorentino in Florence, Italy.

== Residencies ==
Rothschild held a residency at the Baryshnikov Arts Center in New York and participated in the Suzanne Dellal Centre’s inaugural artist-in-residence program, where she created Pigulim.

== Selected works ==
- Trilogy for Batsheva (*Summer Snow*, *On the Edge of Nowhere*, *A Year Without Summer*) (2021)
- Pigulim (2021) – dance-film presented by Baryshnikov Arts Center
- Petrushka (2023) – reinterpretation for Opera Ballet Vlaanderen

Bachtrack described the production as “a stripped-back rethinking of the original… parable” featuring “a wooden donkey” in the starring role. De Morgen noted the evening’s visual richness, describing “a poetic puppet of early life and hope,” and commented that the choreography leaned toward contemplative rather than kinetic expression.

- This Solution (2024) – world premiere at NDT 2 in The Hague
- The Death of Klinghoffer (2026) – choreography for Luca Guadagnino's production of the opera by John Adams, conducted by Lawrence Renes, at the Maggio Musicale Fiorentino in Florence, Italy
- Acord (2015) – a one-woman performance combining dance, storytelling, music, and puppetry in non-traditional venues such as galleries. The Jerusalem Post described it as blending "visual theater with physical storytelling".

== Critical reception ==
- On Petrushka / Die sieben Todsünden (Opera Ballet Vlaanderen, 2023), Bachtrack highlighted Rothschild’s “stripped-back rethinking” and unconventional imagery.
- De Morgen described the production as visually striking, featuring a “poetic puppet of early life and hope.”
- Reviewing The Death of Klinghoffer, Il Giornale della Musica praised Rothschild's choreography as emotionally affecting and said that its gestural language gave voice to the words.
