= EllaHarp =

American harpist and singer

Ella Dawn Jenkins (born 1988 or 1989), known professionally as EllaHarp, is an American harpist and singer. She first received attention in the 2010s, as a blogger in the tiny-house movement.

== Early life and education ==
Jenkins grew up in Malibu. At age 16, her family moved to Frazier Park, in Kern County, California. Her paternal grandfather was arranger and composer Gordon Jenkins.

At age 7, Jenkins began taking piano lessons, but she switched to harp at age 8 after discovering her love for the instrument.

Jenkins attended the Royal Scottish Academy of Music and Drama, where she earned a bachelor’s degree in Scottish Music. While attending school, she sometimes busked in Glasgow to supplement her income.

== Career ==
In the early 2010s, one of Jenkin's harps was destroyed when she checked it on a flight. She learned to play the banjo, a more easily transportable instrument, as she was worried about flying with a harp again. In mid-2016, Jenkins decided to design a harp specifically with airplane overhead luggage compartments in mind. Her smaller model has an aluminum frame, which allows strings to have more tension compared to a wooden frame; aluminum is also more durable and less at risk to temperature fluctuations than wood. Her model has only 29 strings, rather than the usual 30; she left out the high A string, as she rarely used it. Jenkins and her then-boyfriend began experimenting with several different models, and by 2022 the pair had made three aluminum harps, two of which Jenkins has flown with successfully. Jenkins has also built a banjo, which fits into a harp case.

Jenkins released her debut album, Who Asked you Back, in February 2018. Her goal with the album was to challenge listeners' perceptions of harp music, with some tracks having blues influences. Guitarist Sam Eigen guested on several of the album's tracks.

In 2021, Jenkins released her second album, Screaming into the Void. The titular track was released as a single in April 2020, and a music video for the song was released in September 2021.

In June 2023, she released her third album, Lost in January.

== Tiny-house movement ==
In the early 2010s, Jenkins was a blogger in the tiny-house movement. She also taught tiny house workshops throughout the United States while working for Tumbleweed Tiny House Company.

Jenkins built her tiny home over the course of a year, with her stepfather's help, in the driveway of her parents' house. She lived in her tiny house for about five years, at times with her boyfriend and dog. She moved out of her tiny house in 2017, saying her "life goals...outgrew the tiny house".
