= Ella Pearson Mitchell =

Ella Pearson Mitchell (1917 - 2008) was a Baptist minister, preacher, educator, and author. She was one of the first African-American women to graduate from Union Theological Seminary, and was later ordained to the Christian ministry in 1978. She was the first woman to be appointed Dean of Sisters Chapel at Spelman College in Atlanta. A gifted preacher, Mitchell was named by Ebony Magazine as one of America's "15 Greatest Black Women Preachers" in 1997. During her career, she taught at Berkeley Baptist Divinity School, Colgate Rochester Divinity School, the Interdenominational Theological Seminary, and Union Theological Seminary in Dayton, Ohio. She edited multiple volumes in a series of sermons by women, entitled Those Preaching Women, and co-authored two books with her husband, Henry H. Mitchell.

== Early childhood ==
Ella Pearson was born in Charleston, South Carolina in 1917 to Joseph R. Pearson and Jessie Wright Pearson. At an early age, she started singing and preaching in her father's church, Olivet Presbyterian Church, and accompanying him on pastoral visits on her bicycle. She gave her first sermon at 15 years old.

== Marriage ==
Mitchell met her husband, Henry Mitchell, while they were both attending Union Theological Seminary, and they married in 1944. They were married for sixty-four years, until Ella's death in 2008. They had four children, one of whom was adopted from Korea. Their son, Henry Jr., died of leukemia when he was 20 years of age. During their many years together, Ella and Henry often collaborated professionally, as educators, authors, preachers, and mentors for doctoral students.

== Education ==
Mitchell attended Talladega College, where she was the first student to major in religion and graduated with her bachelor's degree. While at Talladega, she was very active in chapel activities, participating in and leading worship services, as well as sewing some of the altar cloths. In 1942, she graduated from Union Theological Seminary in New York City, with a Masters of Arts degree in Christian Education. She was the second African American woman to graduate from the seminary, following Eunice C. Jackson, who graduated in 1940. She earned a Doctor of Ministry degree from the School of Theology at Claremont, California, in 1974.

== Career ==
Mitchell is known as the "dean of Black women preachers", and enjoyed a robust career as a preacher, professor, and author. Mitchell was elected to the Board of Education and Publications of the American Baptist Convention, and served as president of the board from 1959 to 1973.

Mitchell was ordained in 1978 by the Allen Temple Baptist Church, even though she was licensed as a minister in 1943.

Mitchell has held many positions in the academic world: first woman Dean of Sisters Chapel at Spelman College; professor at American Baptist Seminary of the West and the School of Theology at Claremont; associate professor at Virginia Union University; and instructor in Religious Education at Berkeley Baptist Divinity School.

Together with her husband, Henry Mitchell, she served as a mentor at Ohio's United Theological Seminary in the Doctor of Ministry Program. The Mitchells founded the Ecumenical Center for Black Church Studies in Los Angeles, California. In addition, they team-taught as visiting professors of homiletics at Atlanta's Interdenominational Theological Center, using a pedagogical style that emphasized dialogue between the two of them.

They travelled together to Africa in the 1970s, to research traditional storytelling and proverbs in Ghana and Nigeria.

On November 20, 2008, Ella Pearson Mitchell died at the age of 90.

== Honors ==
In 1997, Ella Pearson Mitchell was selected by Ebony Magazine as one of the "15 Best Black Women Preachers" in the United States, in recognition of the "excellent construction and dramatic delivery of her sermons."

Ella and Henry Mitchell received the 2008 Union Theological Seminary Trailblazer Award, which recognizes outstanding African-American alumni. They were also named Samuel DeWitt Proctor Conference "Beautiful Are Their Feet" Honorees in 2004.

In 2016, Union Theological Seminary established the Eunice C. Jackson & Ella P. Mitchell Chair in honor of its first two African-American alumnae, with the goal "to promote interdisciplinary explorations at the intersection of religion, race, gender, and women’s studies." Rev. Dr. Angela White, Associate Professor of Theology and Culture at Union, was selected to be the first professor to hold this chair.

== Works ==
Mitchell has authored an extensive collection of books and articles. Her works include the books Women: To Preach or Not to Preach?, Those Preaching Women (5 Volumes), and co-authored with Henry Mitchell, Together for Good and Fire in the Well.
