= Ella Fontanals-Cisneros =

Cuban-born philanthropist and art collector

- Born: Ella Fontanals; La Habana, Cuba
- Other name: Ella Fontanals-Cisneros
- Occupations: Art Collector; Philanthropist; Business Woman
- Years active: 1970s-present
- Organization: Cisneros Fontanals Art Foundation
- Children: 3
- Website: ellacisneros.com

Ella Fontanals-Cisneros is a Cuban-born philanthropist and art collector with an abiding passion, and discerning eye for contemporary art and design. Born in Cuba and raised in Venezuela, her vision has made a significant impact on the Miami arts community and arts organizations around the globe. She is the founder and honorary president of the Cisneros Fontanals Art Foundation (CIFO).

== Early life and education ==
Ella Fontanals-Cisneros was born in Cuba but moved to Venezuela at a very young age.

Her father died shortly after she fled with her family from Cuba to Venezuela when Fontanals-Cisneros was sixteen. She took her first job teaching English and, on the side, began offering water ballet lessons to her students. “It was my first entrepreneurial thing” she said in a 2007 interview for W magazine. It set a tone for her future endeavors as a high fashion boutique owner, raw materials exporter and Manhattan high-end apartment flipper, all of which preceded her career of collecting contemporary art and making it accessible to the public.

== Career ==
Ella Fontanals-Cisneros is also known as entrepreneur and a pioneer in new technologies and other industries. She has served as a board member in both the corporate level and non-profit. She was the chief executive officer of TGF Technologies, board member of Pepsi-Cola Venezuela, president of Su Red; a portal of the mobile operator Telcel; president of EFC Holdings, trustee at the Institute of International Education in New York and the United Artist in California.

She is currently a board member the Institute of Contemporary Art (ICA) in Miami, the New Museum and El Museo del Barrio, both in New York.

== The Cisneros Fontanals Art Foundation (CIFO) ==
Since the 70s she has been involved with the arts; at a very young age she opened an art gallery named “Sans Souci” in Caracas, Venezuela, encouraging her to follow her passion of collecting art. Latin American art was her first encounter with collecting, later developing her interest for international contemporary art.

In 2002, she and her family founded The Cisneros Fontanals Art Foundation (CIFO); a non-profit organization dedicated to supporting contemporary Latin American artists. The foundation provides a platform for presenting the work of groundbreaking artists whose investigations address relevant social, cultural, and political issues.

CIFO's mission is to support and advance cultural understanding and educational exchange through three primary initiatives: the Grants & Commissions Program, which supports the production of new works by emerging, mid-career and established Latin American artists; the CIFO Collection, and other related art and cultural projects in the U.S. and internationally. In 2011, CIFO expanded to Europe to increase its mission of promoting Latin American Art.

Since its foundation, CIFO has organized exhibitions of works drawn from the CIFO collection and the Ella Fontanals-Cisneros Collection, which have been shown at institutions across the U.S. and abroad.

During the past five years, Ella Fontanals-Cisneros has been actively working and collaborating with art programs in Cuba with institutions such as the Museum of Fine Arts in Havana, the Lam Institute, and also the promotion of Cuban artists.

Ella Fontanals-Cisneros has loaned selections from her substantial and eclectic collection of Latin American art to the Metropolitan Museum of Art (MET), NY; The Whitney Museum of American Art, NY; The Museum of Fine Art of Houston (MFAH), Texas; The Museum of Latin American Art (MOLAA), Long Beach, California; El Museo Nacional Centro de Arte Reina Sofía (MNCARS), Madrid; Haus der Kunst, Munich, Germany; among others.

== The Ella Fontanals Cisneros Collection ==
What started as the acquisition of artwork for personal enjoyment matured into a life-long project. As the Ella Fontanals-Cisneros Collection has grown and developed, its scope has broadened.

There are four main areas of interest that have been systematically increasing in recent years: Geometric Abstraction from Latin America; Contemporary International and Latin American Art; Contemporary Video; Modern and Contemporary Photography.

Today, The Ella Fontanals Cisneros Collection has more than 2,500 artworks from artists such as: Marina Abramović, Lygia Clark, Los Carpinteros, Ai WeiWei, Carmen Herrera, León Ferrari, Gego, Damien Hirst, Jenny Holzer, Donald Judd, Anish Kapoor, Barbara Kruger, Julio Le Parc, Sol Lewitt, Jesús Rafael Soto, Alejandro Otero, Ana Mendieta, Helio Oiticica, Fischli & Weiss, Bill Viola, among others.

== Philanthropy ==
Ella Fontanals-Cisneros has been contributing to a humanitarian vision and environmentally conscious perspectives of the world since she was a teenager.

In 1988, she co-founded the Antonio Cisneros Bermudez Foundation with her former husband Oswaldo Cisneros. The mission of the foundation was to collaborate with public hospitals by providing them with training and know-how for the institution's personnel, helping them improve patient treatment before and after being admitted to the hospital. A couple of years later, she founded the Together Foundation in Venezuela with the mission of improving the lives of children by providing them with proper education, health and nutrition.

She is also a humanitarian and environmentalist. As an early advocate for the use of information technologies, she founded the Together Foundation in the United States in 1989 with the objective of uniting the world around environmental problems.

Working at the United Nations (U.N.), she organized the first information committee at the economic and social council, foreseeing that information and connectivity was key for the world to solve its problems. The Together Foundation worked in an important program organizing a database of best practices, in partnership with “Habitat”. This program has become useful for most of the U.N. departments and it remains a fundamental tool for the organization.

In 1992, the Together Foundation designed a program with the environmental department of the University of Vermont, with the idea of developing the first electronic communications database for the environment. This system later produced a new venue of public access that connected people in the state of Vermont and beyond. The venue became a company called Together Networks, which at the time became the largest Internet Service Provider (ISP) in New England. In the year 1999, the company went public as One Main.

== Personal life ==
In 1968 Ella married tycoon Oswaldo Cisneros in Venezuela to whom she was married for 30 years. They got divorced in 2001.

She divides her time between Cuba, Miami, Madrid and Gstaad. She has three daughters with her former husband Oswaldo Cisneros––Marisa, Mariela and Claudia––with whom she actively shares her passion for the arts.
