= Ella Fillmore Lillie =

American painter

- Born: October 3, 1884; Minneapolis, Minnesota
- Died: July 27, 1972 (aged 87); Clearwater, Florida
- Education: School of the Art Institute of Chicago; New York School of Fine Arts

Ella Fillmore Lillie (October 3, 1884 – July 27, 1972) was an American visual artist.

== Life and career ==
Lillie was born in Minneapolis on October 3, 1884. Her education began in Minnesota, but then she headed east to attend the School of the Art Institute of Chicago and New York School of Fine Arts. She studied with Ambrose Webster and Kenneth Hayes Miller, and worked with George Miller and the German master printmaker Theodore Cuno in creating several lithographs. She then worked as a visual artist, lithographer, painter, screen printer, and craftsperson in Vermont and Florida. She died in Clearwater, Florida, on July 27, 1972.
