= Ella Rae =

Ella Rae may refer to:

- Ella Rae Peck, American actress
- Ella-Rae Smith (born 1998), English actress and model
- Ella Rae Wise (born 2000), English television personality
