= Ella Mae =

Ella Mae may refer to:

- Ella Mae Backus (1863–1938), American lawyer
- Ella Mae Gallavan (1903–1966), American pathologist and physician
- Ella Mae Irby (1923–2001), American quilt artist
- Ella Mae Johnson (1904–2010), American social worker, activist and author
- Ella Mae Lentz (born 1954), American deaf author, poet, teacher and advocate
- Ella Mae Morse (1924–1999), American singer
- Ella-Mae Rayner (born 1995), English gymnast, fitness model and television personality
- Ella Mae Romig (1871–1937), American medical missionary
