= Ella Boyce Kirk =

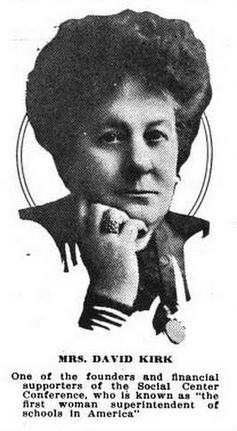
Ella Boyce Kirk, from a 1911 publication.

Ella Boyce Kirk (c.1861 – 1930) was the first woman to become Superintendent of Schools in a Pennsylvania city, and possibly the first in the United States.

She was born in Bangor, Maine ca. 1861, and taught school in Bradford, Pennsylvania before moving to Pittsburgh. In 1890, she married a wealthy oil businessman named David Kirk. She authored My Pilgrimage to Coué (1922).
