= Kate Cumming =

Confederate nurse in the American Civil War

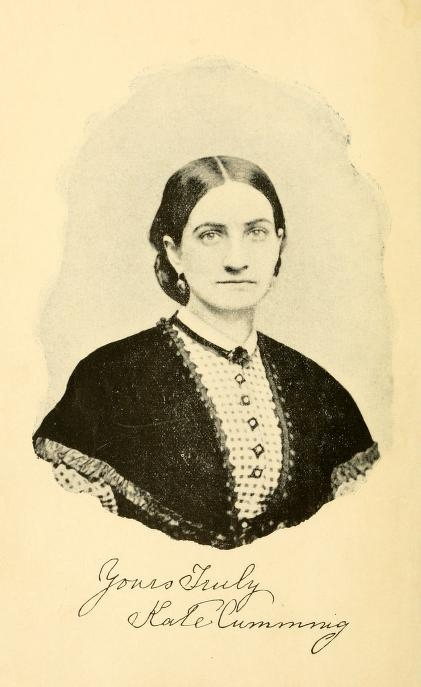
- Born: 1830; Edinburgh, Scotland
- Died: June 5, 1909 (aged 78–79); Birmingham, Alabama
- Occupations: Nurse in the Confederate States Medical Corps, Teacher

Kate Cumming (1830 – June 5, 1909) was a Confederate Civil War nurse.

== Early life ==
Born in Edinburgh, Scotland, her family emigrated to the United States when Cumming was young, and settled in Mobile, Alabama. At the outbreak of the Civil War, Cumming's mother and two sisters left for England, leaving Cumming behind with her father and brother. Against her family's wishes, in April 1862, Cumming volunteered as a nurse in a Confederate hospital located in Corinth, Mississippi, near the location of the Battle of Shiloh after her brother enlisted in the 21st Alabama Infantry. She was inspired to serve by Florence Nightingale as well as Reverend Benjamin M. Miller, who called women specifically to aid the Confederacy.

== Civil War service ==
Cumming began her service at the Mississippi/Tennessee border at the Battle of Shiloh. The Confederacy did not have an organized medical force at the war's inception, making the efforts of nurses like Cumming crucial for Confederate survival. As the medical department became more organized, Cumming occupied a matron position, and traveled with the mobile hospitals of Dr. Samuel Stout. Cumming was an active nurse throughout the war, which was unusual as nurses usually served temporarily. Cumming eventually became the head of food and housekeeping departments in multiple hospitals in Georgia.

"I could fill whole people with descriptions of the scenes I had," wrote Cumming of her battlefield experience. It is clear in her writings that Cumming knew nurses to be vital to the war effort. Cumming maintained a diary throughout her wartime experience, offering readers insight into life of a woman nurse in the war effort. Cumming's diary was published in 1866 under the title A Journal of Hospital Life in the Confederate Army of Tennessee.

== Post-war life ==
At the end of the war, Cumming returned home to Mobile. She published her wartime experiences in 1866, titled A Journal of Hospital Life in the Confederate Army of Tennessee from the Battle of Shiloh to the End of the War. This journal has become one of the few primary sources regarding the work of Confederate nurses. In 1874, she moved to Birmingham, Alabama, with her father, where she worked with a teacher and was an active member of the United Daughters of the Confederacy. She died in Birmingham on June 5, 1909. She is buried in Georgia.
