= Ella Billing =

Swedish women's rights activist and suffragist

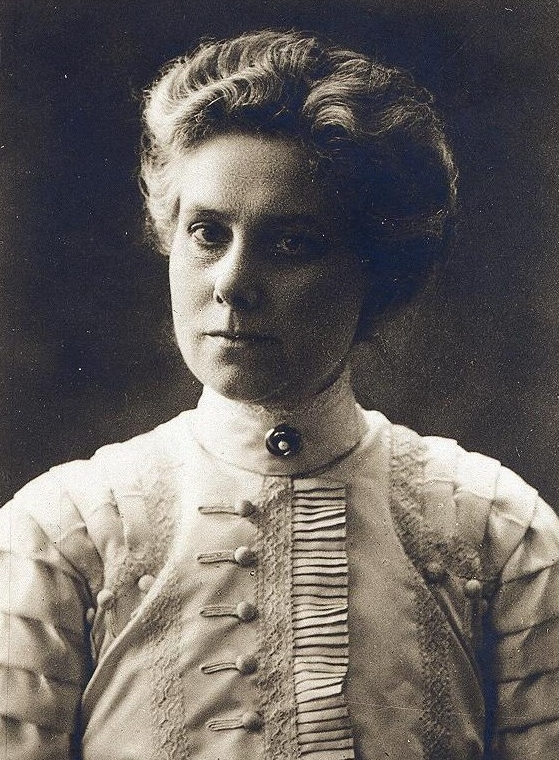
- Born: 26 March 1869; Färlöv, Sweden
- Died: 22 December 1921; Stockholm, Sweden
- Occupation(s): activist and suffragist

Elna (Ella) Billing née Wulff (1869–1921) was a Swedish women's rights activist and suffragist who initially contributed to the women's suffragist association (FKPR) in Kristianstad. She later travelled widely throughout Sweden, even to the far north, establishing suffrage associations. Billing wrote articles on suffrage for the association's journal Rösträtt för kvinnor (Votes for Women). She proved to be a convincing speaker in the Stockholm branch of the National Association for Women's Suffrage.

== Biography ==
Born in Färlöv, Skåne, on 26 March 1869, Elna Wulff was the daughter of the crofter Nils Oredsson Wulff and his wife Johanna née Karlsdotter. She was raised along with several siblings in what appears to have been a modest environment. In 1897, she married Johan Albert Billing (1863–1918) with whom she had two children. She worked for a time as a primary school teacher in Kristianstad where she became a member of the city's Poverty Alleviation Board (Fattigvårdsstyrelsen) where she was noted for her commitment to caring for young people. While in Kristianstad, she was an active member of the FKPR, the local branch of the Association for Women's Suffrage.

In 1912, the family moved to Stockholm where Ella Billing devoted increasing attention to the women's suffrage movement. She travelled around the country, collecting signatures and establishing local associations. In 1913, her visits to the associations in the north of Sweden, attracted considerable attention. She contributed articles to the women's suffrage journal Rösträtt för kvinnor, in particular an encouraging account of the suffrage association in Luleå in which she praised the efforts of its head Märta Bucht.

From 1915, she served for a short period as a member of the Stockholm City Council. She was also chair of the Stockholm branch of the Swedish Women's Citizens' Association (Svenska Kvinnors Medborgarförbund). Ella Billing died in Stockholm on 22 December 1921 and was buried in Kristianstad's Östra Cemetery.
