= Ella May =

Ella May may refer to:

- Ella May Bennett (1855– 1932), American Universalist minister
- Ella May Dunning Smith (1860–1934), American author, composer, pianist, and activist
- Ella May Saison, Filipina singer and songwriter
- Ella May Thornton (1885–1971), American librarian
- Ella May Walker (1892–1960), Canadian-American artist, author, and composer
- Ella May Wiggins (1900–1929), American labor union organizer and balladeer
