= Ella Kruglyanskaya =

Latvian painter (born 1978)

Ella Kruglyanskaya (born 1978) is a Latvian painter who lives and works in New York. Kruglyanskaya is known for her drawings and paintings that exaggerate aspects of the female form.

She has held solo exhibitions at Studio Voltaire in London in 2014, at Thomas Dane in London in 2015 and at Tate Liverpool in 2016. Her work is included in the collections of the Tate Gallery, London.
