= Ella Williams (disambiguation) =

Topics referred to by the same term

Ella Williams (born 1995), is a New Zealand surfer. Ella Williams may also refer to:

- Ella Abomah Williams (1865–1928), African-American performer
- Ella Gwendoline Rees Williams, real name of Jean Rhys (1890–1979), British Creole novelist, short story writer, and essayist
- Ella O'Connor Williams, real name of Squirrel Flower (born 1996), American musician

== Fictional characters ==
- Ella Williams-Payne, in the US sitcom TV series Tyler Perry's House of Payne, played by Cassi Davis
