= Ella Polyakova =

Human rights activist

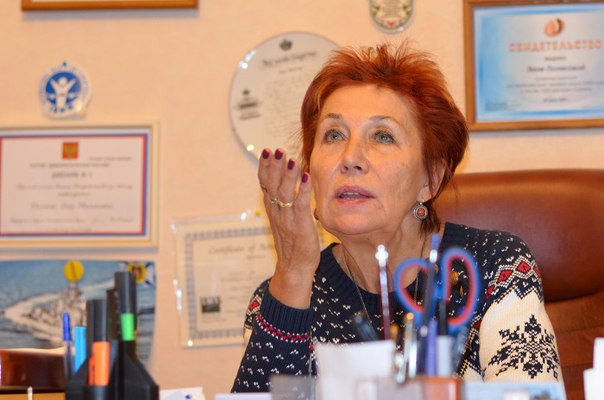
Ella Polyakova

Ella Mikhaylovna Polyakova (Russian: Элла Михайловна Полякова; born 7 February 1941) is a Russian human rights activist, a member of President Vladimir Putin's advisory council on human rights. She is also a leader of non-governmental organization Soldiers' Mothers of St. Petersburg.

== Opinions on the Russian participation in the war in Donbas ==
In a situation where the Kremlin consistently denied its involvement in the Russo-Ukrainian war, Polyakova openly talked about dead and wounded Russian soldiers and also called the Russian intrusion an "invasion". "When masses of people, under commanders' orders, on tanks, APCs and with the use of heavy weapons, (are) on the territory of another country, cross the border, I consider this an invasion," Ella Polyakova said on 29 August 2014.

She has also said more than 100 Russian soldiers were killed in eastern Ukraine in a single battle in August 2014 while helping pro-Russian separatists fight Ukrainian troops. According to her, around 300 people were also wounded in the same incident near the town of Snizhnye, when a column of trucks they were driving, full of ammunition, was hit by a sustained volley of Grad rockets.

== Awards ==
- Galina Starovoitova Peace Prize (1999)
- Aachener Friedenspreis (2004)
- Moscow Helsinki Group Prize (2010)
