= Ella Tengbom-Velander =

Swedish politician (1921–2022)

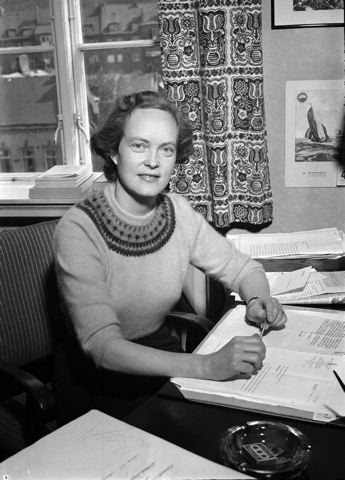
- Born: 28 July 1921; Karlshamn, Sweden
- Died: 23 December 2022 (aged 101); Örkelljunga, Sweden

Ella Tengbom-Velander (28 July 1921 – 23 December 2022) was a Swedish politician who was a member of the Moderate Party. She was the Municipal commissioner of Helsingborg from 1977 to 1982 and 1986 to 1988. From 1967 to 1973, she served as Municipal commissioner of the opposition in Helsingborg. She was the first female Municipal commissioner in Sweden.

Tengbom-Velander turned 100 in July 2021, and died on 23 December 2022, at the age of 101.
