= Ella Briggs =

Austrian architect (1880–1977)

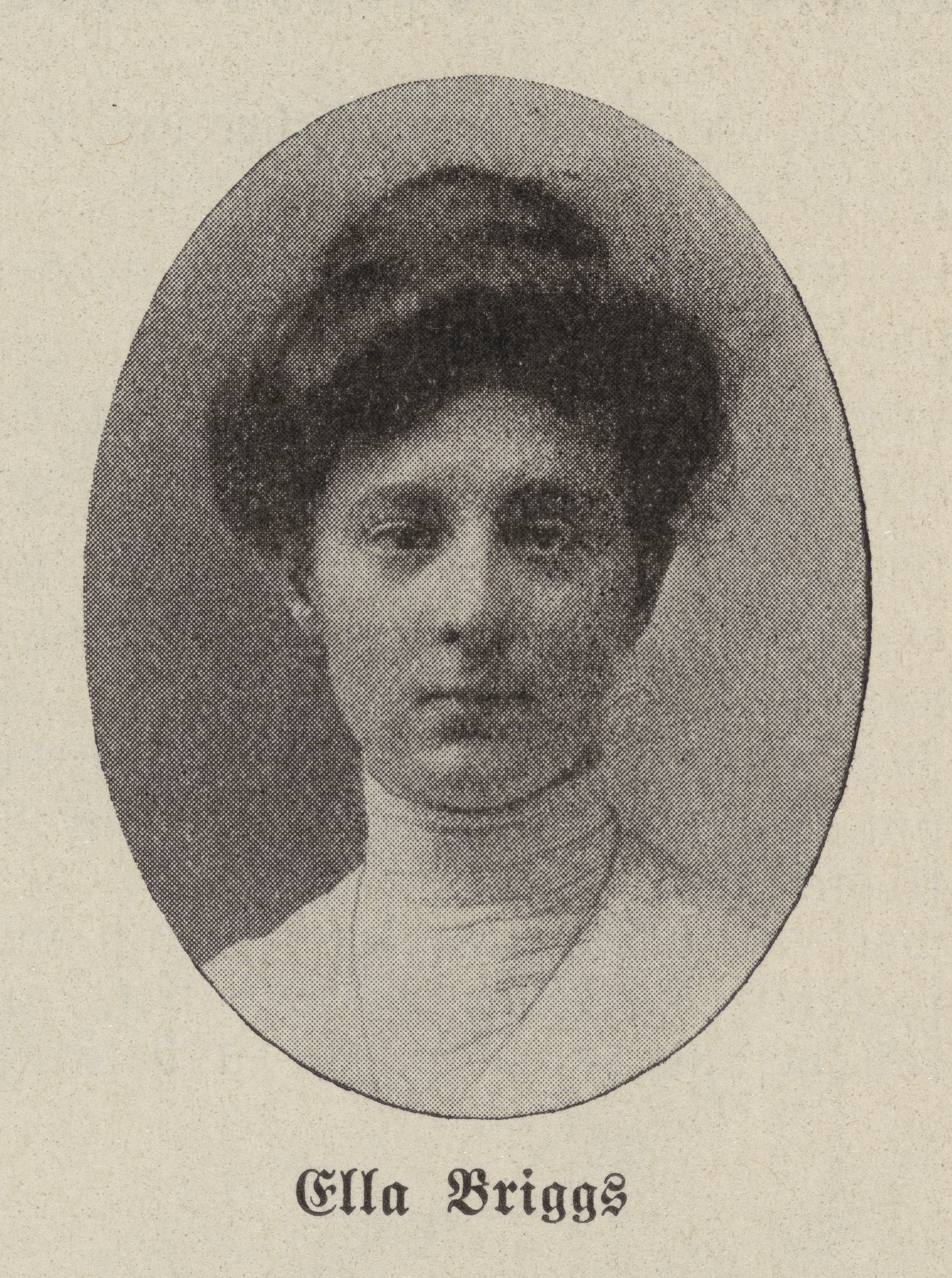
- Briggs in 1908
- Born: Ella Baumfeld; 5 March 1880; Vienna
- Died: 20 June 1977 (aged 97); London
- Education: University of Applied Arts Vienna, Technical University of Munich
- Occupation: Architect
- Spouse: Walter J. Briggs
- Awards: 1904 Louisiana Purchase Exposition medal
- Buildings: Pestalozzi-Hof; Mariendorf Apartment Block; Stowlawn Housing Estate

Ella Briggs (née Elsa Baumfeld; 5 March 1880 – 20 June 1977) was an Austrian designer and architect.

== Life ==
Ella Baumfeld was born into a well-to-do Jewish family in Vienna on 5 March 1880. From 1901 to 1906, she studied at the Kunstgewerbeschule Wien (Applied Arts School of Vienna), primarily with the renowned designer Koloman Moser, one of the leading figures of the Vienna Secession.

Baumfeld travelled to New York City in 1903. There she pursued professional opportunities as an artist. She was awarded a medal at the 1904 Louisiana Purchase Exposition in St. Louis, Missouri. In 1907, she married expat Austrian lawyer Walter J. Briggs in New York, who had fled Austria after being convicted of fraud. They divorced in 1912.

By 1910, she had built a reputation in New York as an original interior designer influenced by Secessionist trends. She decorated the social rooms in New York's New German Theatre located at 59th St. and Madison, which was lauded for its modern approach to theater design. Briggs also furnished and decorated the New York Press Club building with Minna Leigh Mercer. New York Architect magazine praised her interior design schemes, writing that she had "adapted the modern principles of color harmony, simplicity, truthfulness of applied material and comfort to the American taste."

In 1911, Ella Briggs moved back to Vienna, where she worked as an interior designer. In 1912, she opened her own interior design firm in Vienna. In addition to interiors, she also designed furniture. World War I brought a new direction in her career. She wanted to study architecture at the Technische Universitӓt Wien, but women were not yet admitted as regular students or even auditors to its architecture department. Briggs became the first woman to receive permission to audit lectures in the architecture department, which she did from 1916 to 1918. In September 1918, she transferred to the Technical University of Munich, where she continued as an auditor in the architecture department. In fall 1919, she registered as a regular student. At the Technical University of Munich, she studied with German architect Theodor Fischer, among others. She received her degree in architecture in 1920 at the age of forty.

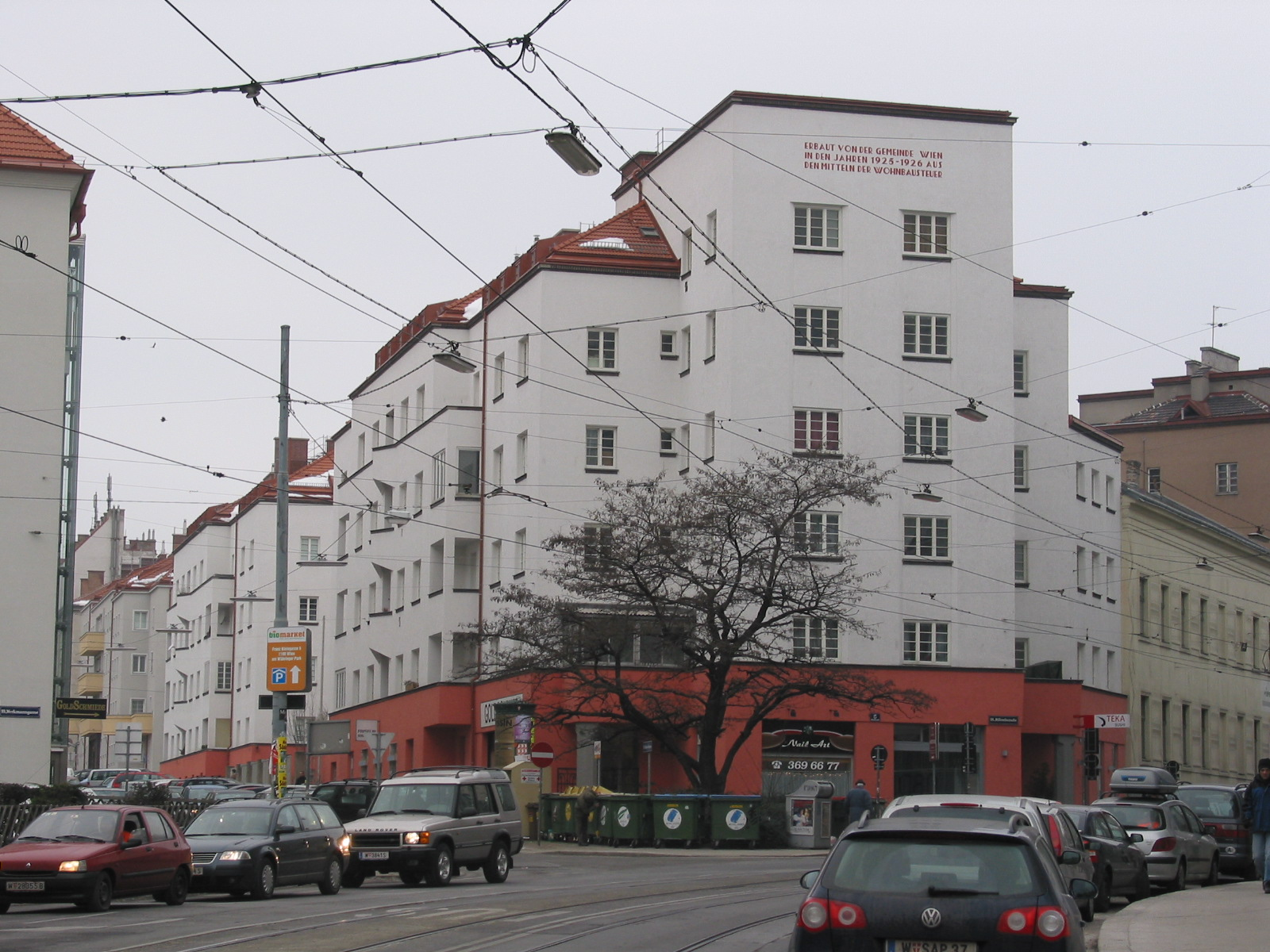
The Pestalozzi-Hof

With Vienna in turmoil after WWI and with a diploma in hand, Briggs returned to New York in 1922 seeking better career opportunities. She received her first independent architecture commissions and also became a contributor for numerous popular women’s magazines, such as Good Housekeeping, writing on the modern home.

While in New York, Briggs maintained professional ties in Vienna. In 1923, she exhibited her work at the Vienna Künstlerhaus. By 1925, she had moved back to Vienna. That year, she obtained a commission from the City of Vienna for a large-scale social housing project, the Pestalozzi-Hof (1925-27). She later received a municipal commission for the first municipal residence for single people in Vienna, the Ledigenheim (1926-28). These projects received critical acclaim and made Briggs a notable player in the social housing projects of Red Vienna. She was one of only two women architects (along with Margarete Schütte-Lihotzky) to receive social housing commissions from the City of Vienna during the interwar period.

On a trip to Italy in 1925 to photograph Sicilian architecture, Briggs was arrested by fascist authorities on suspicion of being a German spy. Her imprisonment was reported by newspapers internationally.

After she obtained her architecture degree, Briggs integrated two Austrian professional architectural associations. In 1921, she became the first female member of the Österreichischer Ingenieur- und Architektenverein, or ÖIAV (Austrian Association of Engineers and Architects). In 1925 Briggs became the first female architect admitted to the Zentralvereinigung der Architekten Österreichs (Central Association of Austrian Architects.

Despite her professional success in Vienna, Briggs did not obtain further commissions from the City of Vienna. In 1927, she moved to Berlin and opened an architecture office. In 1928, she received a commission to design a modernist block in Mariendorf. She also received numerous commissions to design exhibitions. After Adolf Hitler came to power, she shifted her focus to private house commissions. Threatened by a member of the Sturmabteilung and old colleagues, Briggs left for London in September 1935 to look for work. Despite hurdles obtaining a work permit, by 1937 she had immigrated to England and begun rebuilding her architecture practice. Her most important commission of the postwar era was an innovative housing revival scheme in Bilston in the West Midlands. In 1947 she gained British citizenship and became a member of the Royal Institute of British Architects. From 1944 to 1959, she was an architecture contributor to the UK magazine, Homes and Gardens. Briggs died in England on 20 June 1977.

== Works ==
- German Theater, social rooms, New York City, 1908 (demolished)
- New York Press Club interiors, New York City, 1909 (demolished)
- Pestalozzi-Hof in Vienna-Döbling (19th district), Philippovichgasse 2-4, 1925-1927
- Ledigenheim (today Julius-Tandler-Heim) in Wien-Döbling (19th district), Billrothstraße 9, 1926-28
- Apartment block in Berlin-Mariendorf, Rathausstraße 81–83b / Königstraße 42–43, 1928-29
- Haus Widera, Fontanestrasse, Kleinmachnow (Berlin), 1933
- Stowlawn Estate, Bilston, UK, 1946-47
