= Ella Lola =

Ella Lola performs a dance inspired by George du Maurier's character Trilby

Ella Lola (September 2, 1883 – ?) was an American vaudeville dancer at the end of the 19th century.

Lola was born in Boston, Massachusetts. Besides her stage appearances, she was filmed in short Kinetoscope productions such as Ella Lola, a la Trilby (1898) which was an example of Trilbyana.
