= Ella Rodman Church =

American writer

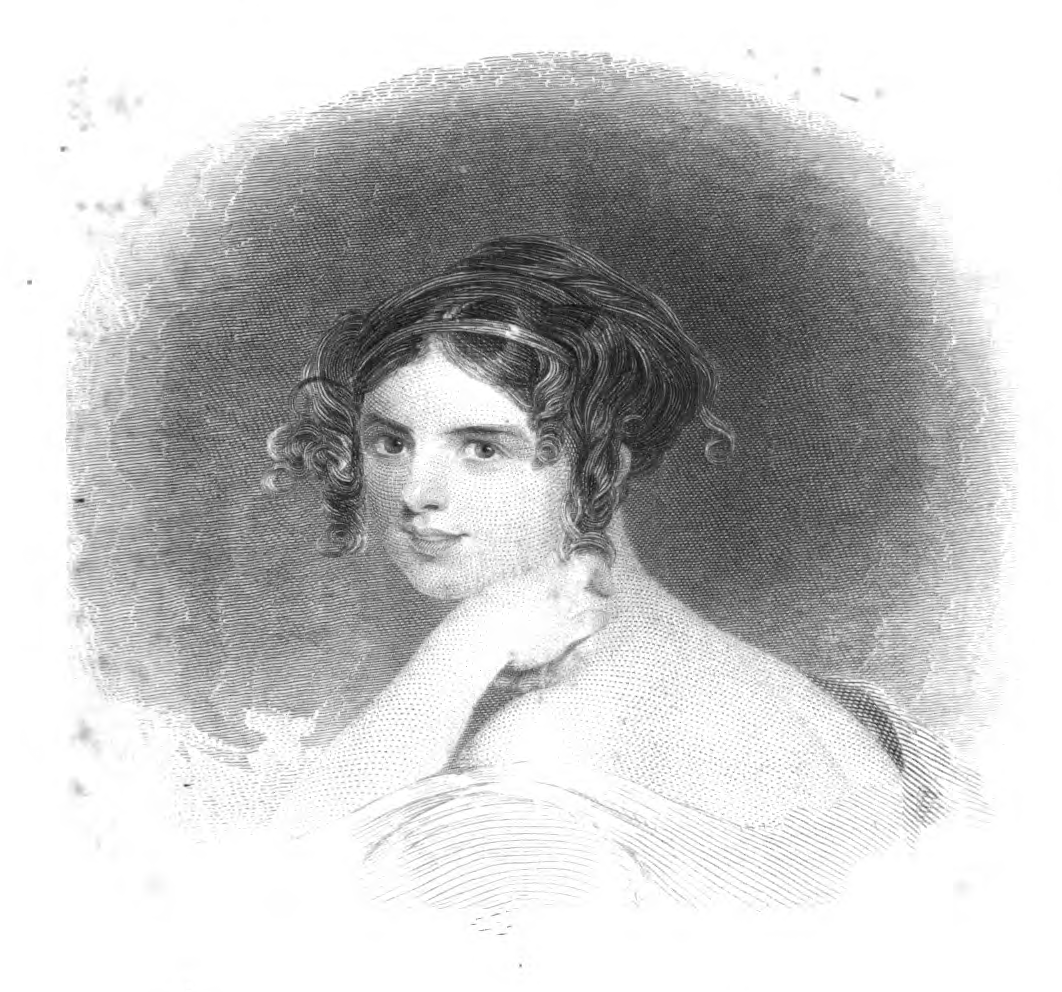
- frontispiece to Flights of Fancy (1853)
- Born: 1831
- Died: October 25, 1912 (aged 80–81); Kings County
- Occupation: Writer

Eliza Rodman McIlvaine Church (1831 – October 25, 1912) was an American writer of fiction, children's literature, and books about homemaking. She wrote under the names Ella Rodman and Ella Rodman Church.

She was born Ella Rodman Mcllvaine, the daughter of Cornelius Prall Mcllvaine and Harriet Robinson.

Her early fiction includes a collection of short stories, Flights of Fancy (1853), and a gothic novel set in southern Italy, The Catanese; or, The Real and the Ideal (1853). She wrote numerous books for children published by religious publishers, including the Elmridge series, where a governess instructs children about the natural world.

On September 21, 1855, she married Joseph Moran Church, a poet, journalist, and publisher of the Philadelphia-based magazine Church's Bizzare. Together they edited a successor magazine, The Fireside Visitor, in 1856.

Ella Rodman Church died on 25 October 1912 in Kings County, New York.

In The Uncollected Henry James (2004), Floyd R. Horowitz attributed a number of stories published under the names Leslie Walter and Fannie Caprice to Henry James. In 2009, Lisa Nemrow established that those were pseudonyms used by Ella Rodman Church.

== Bibliography ==
- A Grandmother's Recollections (New York: C. Scribner, 1851)
- The Catanese; or, The Real and the Ideal (1853)
- Flights of Fancy (1853)
- A Christmas wreath, for little people (Philadelphia : Parry & McMillan, 1855)
- Our home birds (Philadelphia : B. Griffith, c1877)
- Artistic Embroidery; Containing Practical Instructions in the Ornamental Branches of Needlework (New York : Adams & Bishop, 1880)
- How to furnish a home (New York : D. Appleton and co., 1881)
- The home garden (New York, D. Appleton and company, 1881)
- The home needle (New York : D. Appleton and Co., 1882)
- The Wildfords in India (Philadelphia : Presbyterian Board of Publication, c1872)

=== Elmridge ===
- Birds and Their Ways (Presbyterian Board of Publication, 1883)
- Flyers and Crawlers (1885)
- Flower talks at Elmridge (1885)
- Among the Trees at Elmridge (1886)
- Talks by the Seashore (1886)
- In the Hospital at Elmridge (1887)
- Sunday Evenings at Elmridge (1887)
- Little Neighbors at Elmridge (1887)
- Home Animals (1888)
- Some Useful Animals (1888)
- Dangerous Characters (1889)
- Water Animals (1890)

=== Little Pilgrim ===
- The Little Pilgrim (American Sunday School Union, 1879)
- Little Pilgrim at Aunt Lou's (1879)
- Little Pilgrim at Housekeeping (1879)
- Little Pilgrim at School (1879)
- Little Pilgrim's Christmas (1879)
- Little Pilgrim and Her Friends (1879)

=== Little Pilgrim Talks ===
- Little Pilgrim Talks: The Pet Hen [and] Good for Evil (1884?)
- Little Pilgrim Talks: Polly's Potatoes [and] A White Cat (1884?)
- Little Pilgrim Talks: The Terebella [and] Which of the Two (1884?)
- Little Pilgrim Talks: Some Valentines [and] Story of a Boat (1884?)
- Little Pilgrim Talks: Choosing Their Own Presents [and] Fourth of July Story (1884?)
- Little Pilgrim Talks: The Little Shepherdess [and] A Walk into the Country (1884?)
- Little Pilgrim Talks: Why a Boy Had the Croup [and] The Little Shoes (1884?)
- Little Pilgrim Talks: Penny's Night Out [and] Mamie and the Wolf (1884?)
- Little Pilgrim Talks: Helping and Hindering [and] Meddling Frank (1884?)
- Little Pilgrim Talks: The Prodigals (1884?)
- Little Pilgrim Talks: Bounce and Gem (1884?)
- Little Pilgrim Talks: Snowed Up (1884?)
- Little Pilgrim Talks: Being Generous (1884?)
- Little Pilgrim Talks: Lottie's Lessons (1884?)
