= Ella Millar =

Politician

Ella Morrison Millar
- Councillor Ella Millar Morrison in the 1940s
- Born: Ella Morrison Inches; 26 June 1869; Edinburgh, Scotland
- Died: 23 February 1959 (aged 89); Edinburgh, Scotland
- Occupation: Politician
- Known for: First female Scottish city councillor
- Spouse: Thomas John Millar (m. 1898)
- Children: 1

Ella Morrison Millar (née Inches; 26 June 1869 – 23 February 1959) was a politician. She was the first female city councillor and first female magistrate in a Scottish city.

== Early life and education ==
Millar was born on 26 June 1869 in Edinburgh. Her parents were Mary Gray Morison and Sir Robert Kirk Inches, who was a master goldsmith, and Lord Provost of Edinburgh 1912-16.

== Career ==
Prior to commencing her own political career, Millar assisted her father in his duties as Lord Provost. This included work for the Lord Provost's Comfort Fund for troops in the First World War.

In 1919 she ran for Edinburgh Council in the Morningside Ward by-election, and became the first female councillor in a Scottish city in January 1919. Prior to this, women in office in Scottish cities had only served on school and parish council/parochial boards.

In her campaign, she argued ''that Edinburgh faced a number of problems, towards ‘the solution of which’ women could ‘render valuable service’ ''. She ran as an independent candidate in the 1919 by-election. She was a member of the Edinburgh Women Citizens Association; the EWCA supported her in her election campaign.

She was returned in the eight subsequent elections that she contested, with no opposition. In later elections she was associated with the centre-right grouping. This would later be known as the Progressives. In addition to her own work as councillor, she campaigned for the Unionist party of which she was a member.

In 1923, she was elected as a bailie, a Scottish magistrate. She was the first female to hold this position in a Scottish city. She retired in May 1949, and for her services, she was known as the 'Mother of the Council'.

== Personal life ==
Ella Morrison Inches married Thomas John Millar in 1898. They had one daughter.
