= Ella Uphay Mowry =

American politician, suffragist women's rights activist (1865–1923)

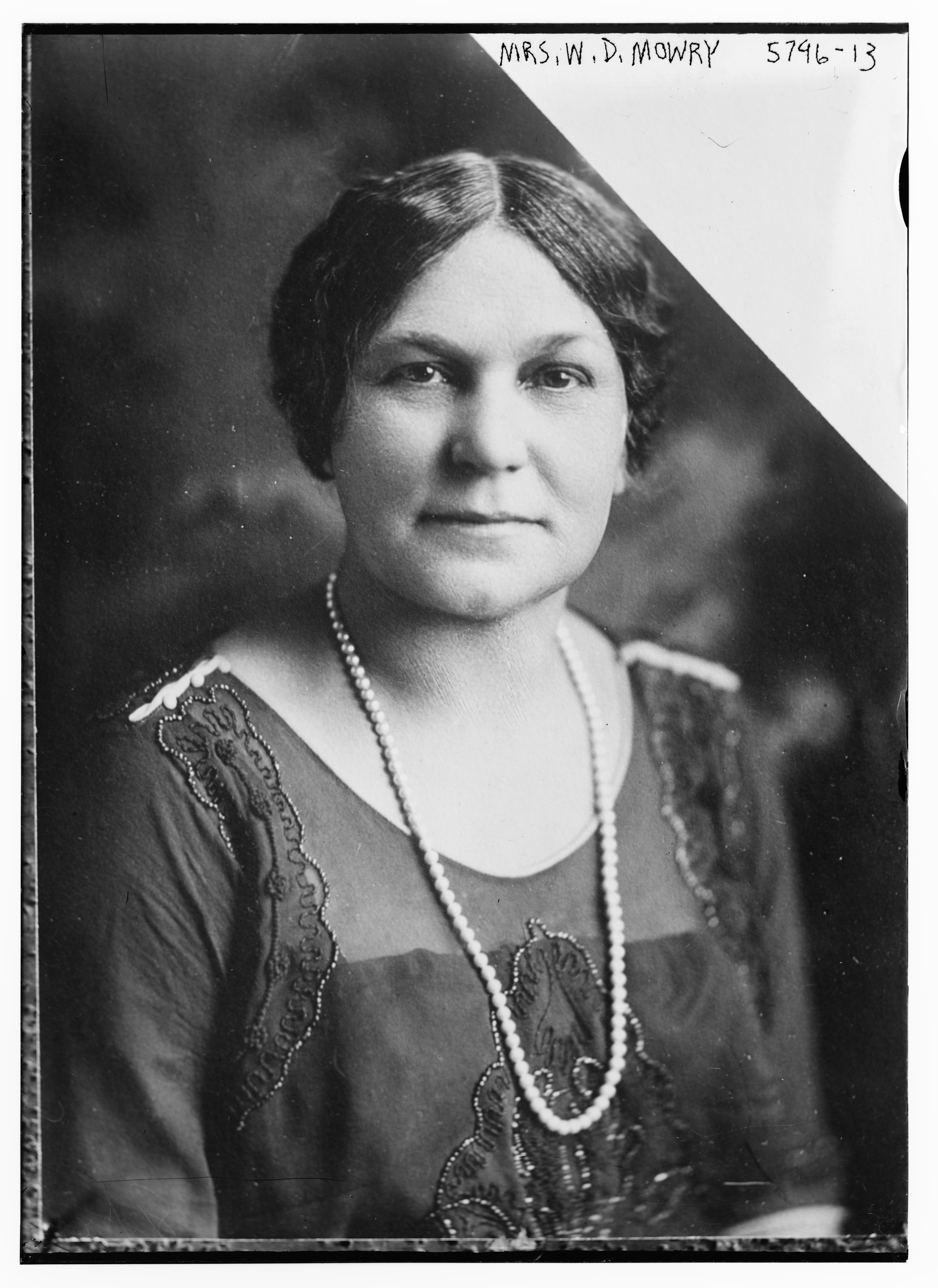
- Born: Ella Uphay Herod; July 1865; Columbus, Indiana
- Died: August 2, 1923 (aged 58); Denver, Colorado
- Other names: Ella Uphay Herod, Mrs. W.D. Mowry
- Occupations: Educator, suffragist, women's rights activist, and the first female gubernatorial candidate in Kansas
- Spouse: Wilmot D. Mowry (1854–1929)
- Parent(s): William Erastus Herod (1821–1906) and Mary Jane (Collier) Herod (1823–1872)

Ella Uphay (Herod) Mowry (July 1865 – August 2, 1923), also known as Mrs. W.D. Mowry, was an American educator, suffragist, and women's rights activist. A member of the Republican Party, she became the first female gubernatorial candidate in Kansas in 1922. According to The Alliance Review and Leader of Alliance, Ohio, upon becoming "the first person to register her intentions for the August primaries" in April 1922, she stated that, "Someone had to be the pioneer. I firmly believe that some day a woman will sit in the governor’s chair in Kansas."

== Formative years ==
Born as Ella Uphay Herod in Columbus, Indiana in July 1865, Ella Uphay Mowry was a daughter of William Erastus Herod (1821–1906) and Mary Jane (Collier) Herod (1823–1872) and the sister of Logan P. Herod (1843–1873) and Louisa (Herod) Carr (1849–1918). After relocating to Kansas with her family when she was a young child, she was educated at the Osage Indian missionary school in St. Paul, Kansas.

In 1894, she married Wilmot D. Mowry (1854–1929), who was described in his 1929 obituary in The Atchison Daily Globe as a “pioneer druggist” of Atchison, Kansas. Their son, Carl Wilmot Mowry (1884–1894), fell ill with "brain fever" at the age of ten in August 1894 and died from typhoid fever in early September at Osage Mission.

== Teaching, suffrage efforts, and political career ==
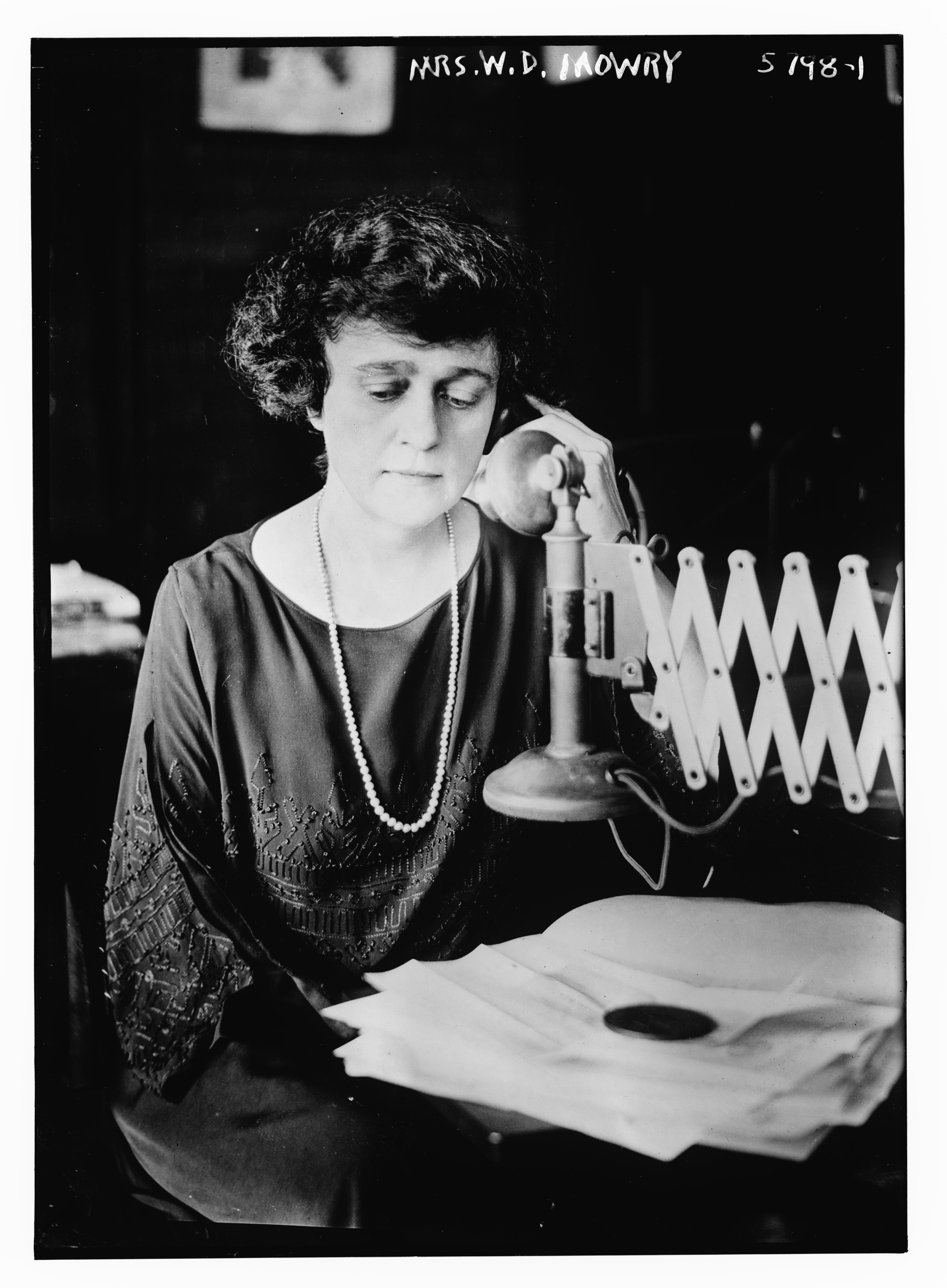

Following the completion of her education, she became a teacher in the local school in St. Paul and then in Parsons, Kansas.

She then became president of the first Wyandotte Republican Club in Kansas City "some years before national suffrage was enacted," was "affiliated with other women’s suffrage and literary organizations," and was appointed as president of the History Club of Kansas City, according to The Alliance Review and Leader.

Chair of the legislative committee of the Kansas City, Kansas Federation of Women's Clubs in 1922, she also was "the first woman to become a candidate for the nomination for governor in Kansas" that year. Running as "Mrs. W. D. Mowry," she had "one woman opponent in the primary election."

According to The Alliance Review and Leader of Alliance, Ohio, she was "the first person to register her intentions for the August primaries" in Kansas in April 1922, and said at that time, "Someone had to be the pioneer. I firmly believe that some day a woman will sit in the governor’s chair in Kansas." Stating that she was not "over-optimistic" about her "prospects for victory in the primary election," she added, "I at least will blaze the way for some more successful sister, later." She also observed that:

"It will take a course of education to persuade women to accept the fact that a woman is perfectly as capable as a man to fill the office of governor…. Too long have they confined their thought to things strictly domestic. I do not advocate that they should desert their household cares. But they should expand mentally and realize the wonderful opportunity to participate in public affairs. Womankind will not have come into her own until she takes a more active part in civic and political matters and has convinced herself as well as the men that women are competent to handle any public office as well as the men can handle it."

At the end of May 1907, she and her husband participated in the 29th Annual Convention of the Kansas Pharmaceutical Association in Wichita. During an executive meeting of the association's Ladies’ Auxiliary, she was elected as first vice president of the auxiliary's board of directors.

== Illness, death, and interment ==
Traveling to Denver, Colorado with her husband in late June 1923, "in hope that [she] would recover her health", she died in Denver on August 2, 1923.

== See also ==
- List of suffragists and suffragettes
- Timeline of voting rights in the United States
- Women's suffrage in the United States
