= Ella Dzelzainis =

Ella Dzelzainis lectures in nineteenth-century literature and is the Postgraduate Research Director for the School of English at Newcastle University.

Dzelzainis is an advisory editor for Oxford Bibliographies and is on the editorial boards of the Gaskell Journal on "Interdisciplinary Studies in the Long Nineteenth Century", and the journal Victorians: A Journal of Culture and Literature.

In December 2016, Dzelzainis was part of the expert panel on the life of the claimed first female sociologist Harriet Martineau, on BBC Radio 4's In Our Time.

== Selected publications ==
- Dzelzainis, Ella (2008), "'Filthy Lucre': Christianity, Commerce and the Female Bodily Economy in Seamstress Narratives of the 1840s", in Morgan, Victoria (ed.), Shaping Belief : Culture, Politics, and Religion in Nineteenth-Century Writing, Liverpool University Press, ISBN 978-1-84631-568-8
- Dzelzainis, Ella (2010), Harriet Martineau: Authorship, Society and Empire, Manchester University Press, ISBN 978-0-7190-8133-0
- Dzelzainis, Ella; Livesey, Ruth (2013), The American Experiment and the Idea of Democracy in British Culture, 1776-1914, Ashgate Series in Nineteenth-Century Transatlantic Studies, Ashgate, ISBN 978-1-4094-7312-1
