= Ella B. Kendrick =

American journalist, temperance, education, and women's rights reformer

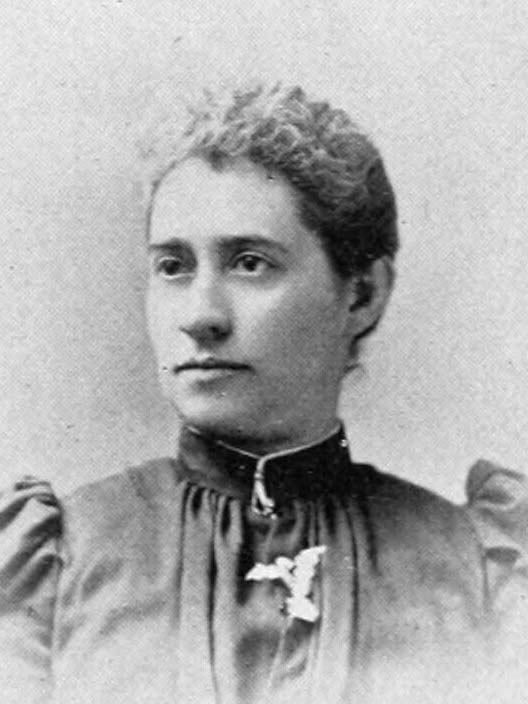
- "A Woman of the Century"
- Born: Ella B. Bagnell; May 24, 1849; Plymouth, Massachusetts, U.S.
- Died: May 11, 1928 (aged 78); Hartford, Connecticut, U.S.
- Occupation: temperance activist

Ella B. Kendrick (née Bagnell; May 24, 1849 – May 11, 1928) was an American temperance activist. She also served as the associate editor of New England Home, one of the leading prohibition newspapers of the country. Through the columns, she waged a systematic campaign against all liquor traffic.

== Early life and education ==
Ella B. Bagnell was born in Plymouth, Massachusetts, close to Plymouth Rock, May 24, 1849. She was the daughter of Richard William Bagnell (1822-1918) and Harriet S. Allen Bagnell (1826-1891). Kendrick's siblings were Susan (b. 1854), Richard (b. 1856), and Timothy (b. 1860).

She was educated in the public schools, and graduated from the Plymouth high school at the age of sixteen.

== Career ==
On September 1, 1870, in Boston, she married Henry H. Kendrick (b. 1848), and in the following year removed to Meriden, Connecticut, where she spent several years in her husband's store and acquired skill in business management.

She was interested in scientific studies, first especially in astronomy, and later in botany, and she spent much time in the fields, woods, and hills of Meriden, gaining a thorough knowledge of the flora of the town. For a number of years, she was among the most active member of the Meriden Scientific Assonation, serving on different committees and reading papers from time to time on a variety of subjects, especially those pertaining to plants and plant life.

She was at the same time, an efficient member of the Woman's Christian Temperance Union (W.C.T.U.), being an advocate of temperance reform. She took a strong interest in public affairs, and especially in politics. She was accounted one of the active leaders of the Prohibition Party in Connecticut. She served as secretary of the Meriden Prohibition Club, also secretary for New Haven County, and in the latter capacity, was an active director of the party work in the campaign of 1890.

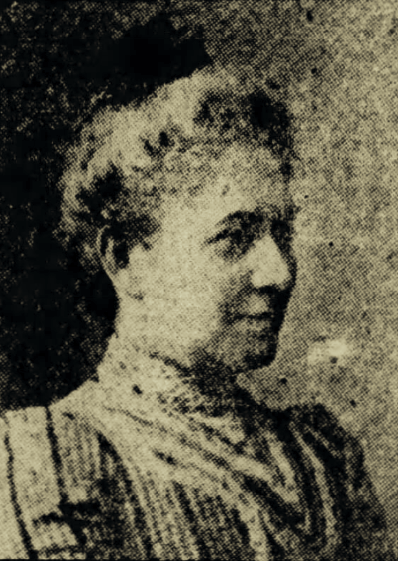
(1922)

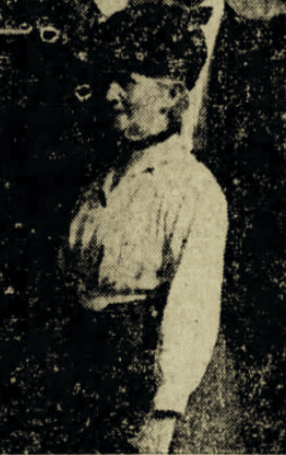
(1922)

In 1891, she removed from Meriden to Hartford where her husband became business manager of the New England Home, one of the leading prohibition newspapers of the country, and Mrs. Kendrick became associate editor. She was assistant secretary of the Hartford Prohibition Club and State superintendent of Demurest Medal Contests.

Kendrick served as president of the Hartford W.C.T.U., secretary of the Woman's Alliance of the Unitarian Church, and treasurer of the Equal Rights Club. She attended regularly all sessions of the State Legislature; she did not miss more than a dozen meetings in 20 years. In 1922, she announced:— "I am out to be chief of police and I will support the man for mayor who will appoint me to that position."

== Personal life ==
Her home in Meriden was a museum of antiques and curios, books, pictures, china, articles of furniture and bric-a-brac, together with various objects of natural history, stones and plants, including a unique fossil of a fruit of the cycad, taken by her husband from the Triassic shales of Durham, Connecticut.

A resident of Hartford for 37 years, Ella B. Kendrick died there on May 11, 1928.
