= Ella Cooke =

New Zealand nurse

Ella Kate Cooke (c. 1887 – 8 September 1917) was a New Zealand nurse who was killed in an accident while on active service in Egypt in World War I.

== Early life ==
Cooke was born in Auckland, New Zealand, to Henry and Sarah Cooke. She had a twin sister, Lily. Cooke trained as a nurse at Auckland Hospital, completing her courses in 1907.

== Career ==
On completing her training, Cooke moved to Gisborne and nursed at the Cook Hospital there. From 1910 to 1913 she was a nurse at Hawera Hospital and then she was appointed Native Health Nurse for the Waikato area. She was based in Ngāruawāhia and served an area bounded by Kawhia, Mercer, Te Kuiti and south of Morrinsville. In July 1914, Cooke and her sister Lily departed for an overseas trip to North America and England. However, by the time they arrived in London, World War I had broken out. In November 1914, Cooke left England with the French Flag Nursing Corps and worked in a French Red Cross hospital in Bernay, near Rouen, for six months.

She then returned to England and joined Queen Alexandra's Imperial Military Nursing Service. She spent some weeks training at Connaught Hospital in Aldershot, and then in September 1915 she was posted to Alexandria, Egypt. Cooke was nursing there when, in 1917, she was killed; she was hit by a train while crossing a railway line near the hospital.

Cooke is buried at Hadra War Memorial Cemetery in Alexandria. Her name is inscribed on the screens as part of the Five Sisters window in York Minster, England.
