= Ella Amitay Sadovsky =

Israeli artist and physical chemist (born 1964)

- אלה אמיתי סדובסקי
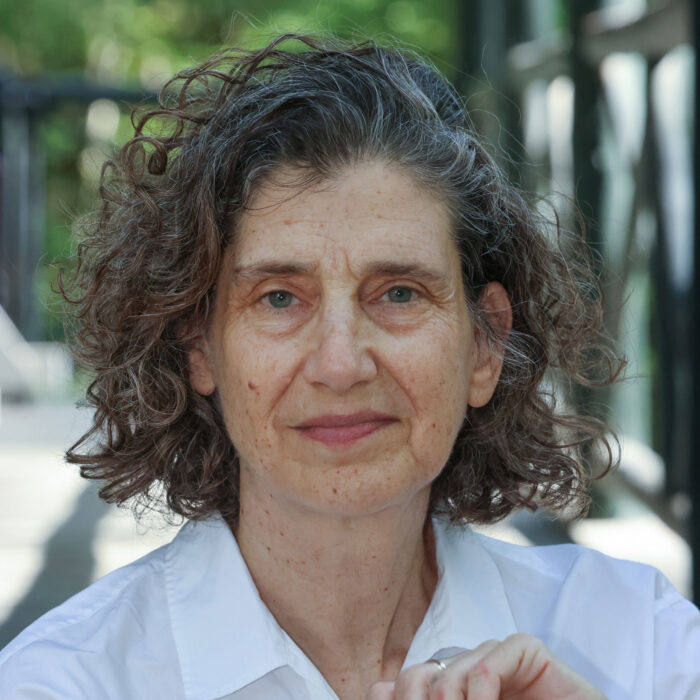
- Born: Ella Amitay; 1964 (age 61–62); Kibbutz Gesher, Israel
- Education: Bezalel Academy of Arts and Design (2007–2009); California College of the Arts (2003–2004); Weizmann Institute of Science (1994–1999); Technion (1991–1994)
- Known for: Painting, Printmaking, Video art, Mixed media
- Awards: Ann and Ari Rosenblatt Prize for Visual Art (2016); Ministry of Culture and Sports Prize (2012)
- Website: amitaysadovsky.com

Ella Amitay Sadovsky (Hebrew: אלה אמיתי סדובסקי; born 1964) is an Israeli artist and physical chemist, born in Kibbutz Gesher, Israel. Her artistic practice incorporates her background in science, focusing on large-scale mixed-media paintings, fabric collages, and stop-motion video installations.

== Biography ==
Ella studied at the Technion, where she received her BSc in Chemical Engineering in 1991 and her MSc in 1994. She received her PhD in Materials and Interfaces from the Weizmann Institute of Science in 1999. Following this, she completed a postdoctoral fellowship in Physical Chemistry and Mechanical Engineering at the University of California, Berkeley (2000–2003).
Transitioning into fine arts, she studied at the California College of the Arts in San Francisco (2003–2004) and Hamidrasha School of Art (2004). She earned her BFA with honors in 2007 and her MFA in 2009 from the Bezalel Academy of Arts and Design.
Ella is a Senior Lecturer in the Department of Textile Design at Shenkar College of Engineering and Design (since 2009) and in the Faculty of Architecture and Design at the Technion (since 2013). Previously, she was a Senior Lecturer in the Department of Physical Chemistry at the Hebrew University of Jerusalem (2004–2007).
Her works are included in public and private, national and international collections, including those of The Open Museum, the Israel Museum in Jerusalem, the Tel Aviv Museum of Art, the Janco Dada Museum's collection, the Dubi Shiff Art Collection and Luciano Benetton's Imago Mundi collection.

=== Solo ===
- 2004 Women of the Village, University of California, Berkeley, USA
- 2009 Band Aids, The Art Gallery, Tivon, Israel
- 2010 Dreams Decipherer, Gordon Gallery, Tel Aviv, Israel
- 2012 Quiet Island, Video Projection at Musrara, Jerusalem, Israel
- 2012 Short Escape, Gordon Gallery 2 for Contemporary Art, Tel Aviv, Israel
- 2012 Landing, Janco Dada Museum, Ein Hod, Israel
- 2014 Spare Parts, The Open Museum, Tefen, Israel
- 2015 Principle of Uncertainty, Gordon Gallery, Tel Aviv, Israel
- 2015 Shelf Life, The Weizmann Institute of Science, Israel
- 2016 SEVEN, The Ann and Ari Rosenblatt Prize for Visual Art, The Artists' House, Tel Aviv, Israel
- 2019 Glasshouse, Gordon Gallery, Tel Aviv, Israel
- 2022 In Process, Cité internationale des arts, Paris, France
- 2024 Without Leaving Home, Gordon Gallery, Tel Aviv, Israel
- 2024 Out There, Wilfrid Israel Museum, Kibbutz Hazorea, Israel
- 2025 Suddenly, just when you thought it was gone, Petach Tikva Museum of Art, Israel

=== Group ===
Sadovsky has participated in several group exhibitions in Israel and around the world, including at the Haifa Museum of Art, Janco Dada Museum in Ein Hod, Eretz Israel Museum, Ashdod Museum of Art, Bait Mani Bank Leumi Museum Space in Tel Aviv, Glasgow School of Art, California College of the Arts, Petach Tikva Museum of Art, Israel Museum, The Museum for Islamic Art, and the Venice Biennale (2017).

=== Curated ===
- 2019 KimonoMatrix, Wilfrid Israel Museum of Asian Art and Studies, Kibbutz Hazorea, Israel (student textile exhibition curated by Amitay Sadovsky)

== Honors and awards ==
- 2025 The MacDowell Colony Fellowship, USA
- 2023 Outstanding Lecturer Award, Shenkar College of Engineering, Design and Art
- 2016 Ann and Ari Rosenblatt Prize for Visual Art
- 2015 The MacDowell Colony Fellowship, USA
- 2012 Ministry of Israeli Culture and Sports prize
- 2007 Prize for Excellence in Art, Bezalel Academy of Arts and Design
- 2005 The Minister of Science scholarship for Returning Scientists
- 2004 Robert Ralls Memorial Scholarship, California College of the Arts
- 2004 Best of Junior Review, California College of the Arts

== Selected publications ==
- Directed Self-Assembly of Gold-Tipped CdSe Nanorods
- Evaluation of Young's modulus of polymers from Knoop microindentation tests
- Characterization of polymer surface structure and surface mechanical behaviour by sum frequency generation surface vibrational spectroscopy and atomic force microscopy
- Hardness and Young's Modulus of Transcrystalline Polypropylene by Vickers and Knoop Microindentation
