= Ella Trebe =

German anti-Nazi resistance fighter

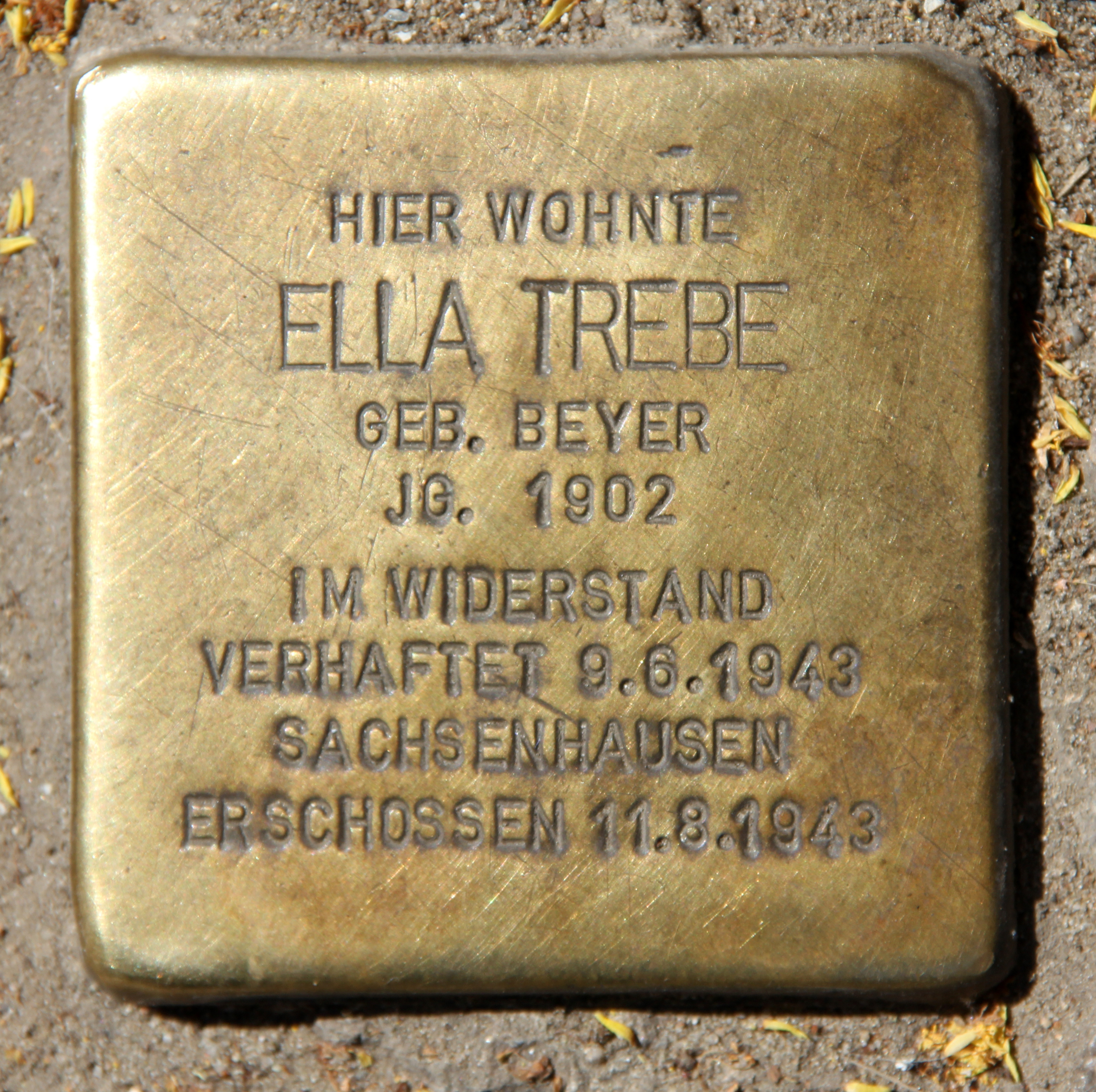
Trebe's Stolperstein in Wedding, Berlin

Ella Trebe (born Ella Beyer: 6 November 1902 - 11 August 1943) was a German factory worker who became an anti-government resistance activist after 1933. She was charged with high treason but was then taken to Sachsenhausen concentration camp where she was shot dead, so that her case never came to trial.

== Biography ==
Ella Beyer was born in Berlin where her mother worked as a washerwoman. She grew up in the city's Wedding quarter. She became a metal worker with the "Lewin" company and then a winder at the AEG plant in the adjacent quarter of Berlin-Gesundbrunnen. It was at AEG that her political engagement began when in 1922 she became a member of the Metal Workers' Union ("Deutscher Metallarbeiter-Verband" / DMV). Four years after that, in 1926, she joined the Communist Party. In 1929 she was elected to membership of the district council. Around this time Ella Beyer also married her partner, Paul Trebe. Towards the end of the 1920s, with nationalist populism on the rise, politics became increasingly polarised. Ella Trebe became an active supporter of the Revolutionary Trades Union Opposition (RGO) movement in 1929/30. In 1931 she was confirmed as "women's leader" on the ruling executive of the Einheitsverband der Metallarbeiter Berlins (literally, "Unity Association of the Berlin Metal Workers" which was an element within the RGO. She also sometimes acted as a "party instructor" for the Communist Party.

The elections in 1932 left the moderate mainstream parties without enough seats in the Reichstag (parliament) to govern except with support from an extremist party. The largest party in the parliament was the Nazi Party, but even they had only 33% of the seats after November 1932, and there was in any case no appetite from either side for a coalition government involving the National Socialists. Through skillful gaming of the unprecedented parliamentary deadlock, in January 1933 the Nazi Party took power and lost no time in transforming Germany into a one-party dictatorship. With (non-Nazi) political activism now illegal, Ella Trebe nevertheless joined the "Sicherheitsapparat Norden" ("Security Apparatus north") which was part of the (now "underground") Berlin region leadership team ("Bezirksleitung") of the Communist Party. She found a new job and between 1934 and 1936 worked at the "Teves GmbH" car parts factory in Berlin-Wittenau where she maintained links with party activists working illegally in the plant.

During the later 1930s, the Gestapo (Secret state police) increasingly grouped anti-Nazi resistance groups together as the Rote Kapelle (loosely, "Red Orchestra"). By the time the Second World War broke out in September 1939 Ella Trebe was clearly viewed as part of this resistance movement. She was politically involved with the journalist and resistance activist Wilhelm Guddorf and Erwin Reisler. She also undertook courier work, maintaining links with underground communist resistance groups operating elsewhere.

During the first part of 1943 Trebe arranged accommodation and contacts for Ernst Beuthke, a communist hero of the Spanish Civil War. He had been parachuted back into Germany as a resistance organiser by the British, landing in a field in the countryside to the west of Berlin. His arrival coincided with the appearance of a number of other German-born resistance fighters, also arriving by parachute, from the Soviet Union. The authorities became aware of the arrival of these so-called "parachute agents" ("Fallschirmagenten") and took immediate steps to arrest them and their "helpers". There are strong indications that Beuthke had conducted himself "imprudently", for instance visiting the home of his parents (whom he had not seen since 1933) for a family reunion. Beuthke was denounced and arrested. All the individuals who had been associated with him were identified and arrested overnight on 9/10 June 1943. That included Ella Trebe and her family. They were accused of "spying for the enemy" ("Feindspionage"). They were taken to the Reich Security Main Office (RSHA) headquarters on the Prinz-Albrecht-Straße and / or the Alexanderplatz penitentiary. It is not known whether they were tortured. Friends and relatives were permitted to bring clothes and food, but not to speak with them.

The formal charge was the usual one, under these circumstances, of "High Treason", but the case never came to trial. Following express orders from Heinrich Himmler, on 11 August 1943 these "Berlin communist prisoners" were taken to Sachsenhausen concentration camp and killed by shooting. Those murdered on this occasion included Ella Trebe and Ernst Beuthke, along with Beuthke's parents and brothers.
