= Ella Simmons =

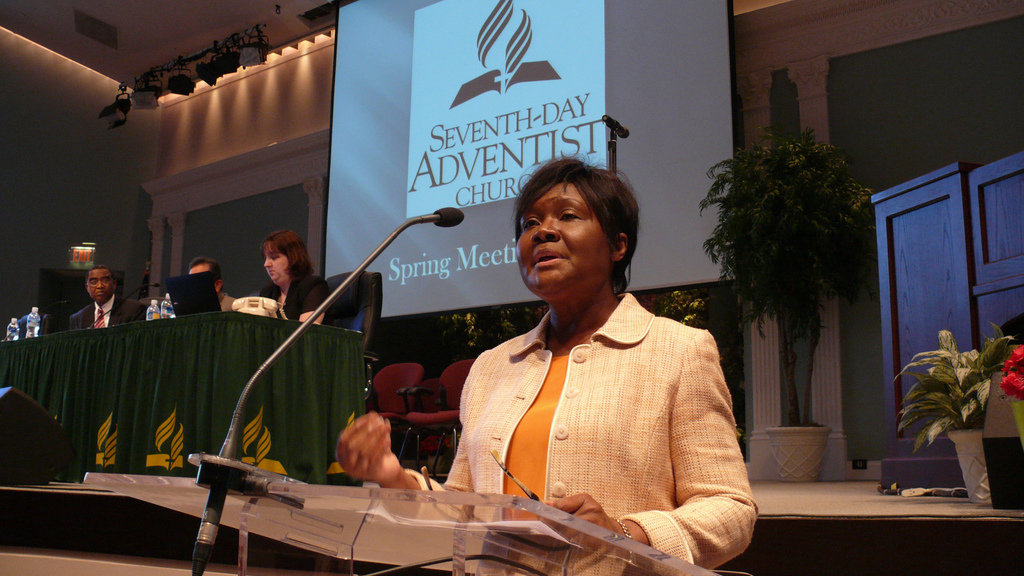
- Born: Louisville, Kentucky
- Education: Indiana University Southeast, Andrews University, University of Louisville

Ecclesiastical career
- Church: Seventh-day Adventist
- Offices held: Vice President, General Conference of Seventh-day Adventists

Ella Simmons is a Seventh-day Adventist administrator and educator. As the only woman to be a vice president of the General Conference of Seventh-day Adventists, she is the highest ranking female official in the history of the denomination, with the exception of three woman treasurers in the pioneer era.

== Background ==
Ella Louise (née Smith) Simmons was born in Louisville, Kentucky. She earned her Bachelor's in Elementary Education from Indiana University Southeast, a Master's in Education from Andrews University, and a doctorate in Education from the University of Louisville. She is married to Nord Simmons, a retired high school teacher, and the couple has two sons, Darryl and Christopher, also educators.

== Career ==
Simmons served in various capacities as an educator for almost thirty years. For the first decade of her career Simmons was variously a high school teacher and principal in schools in Kentucky and Indiana. From 1988 to 1990 she was the chair of the Department of Education at Kentucky State University. She was an assistant professor in the School of Education at the University of Louisville from 1990 to 1997, serving as associate dean of the School of Education in the last two years. In 1997 she became the vice president for academic affairs at Oakwood University in Huntsville, Alabama. From 2000 to 2004 she was the Provost and Vice President for Academic Administration at La Sierra University in Riverside, California.

At the 2005 General Conference session of Seventh-day Adventists Ella Simmons was elected a general vice president of the world church. With this appointment, she became the highest-ranking woman in the denomination's history, aside from three female treasurers who served during its pioneer era. During her tenure, Simmons played a leading role in shaping the educational system of the worldwide church, which grew to over 22 million members. She also became a prominent advocate for women's empowerment within the denomination, speaking openly in favor of gender-inclusive ordination as the church debated the issue.
