= Mary Ella Waller =

American novelist

- Only known photograph of Mary Waller
- Born: March 1, 1855; Boston, Massachusetts
- Died: June 14, 1938 (aged 83); Wellesley, Massachusetts
- Citizenship: USA
- Writing career
- Pen name: M. E. Waller, Mary E. Waller

Mary Ella Waller (March 1, 1855 – June 14, 1938) was an American writer and educator from New England whose work encompassed children's stories, translations of German verse and more than twenty novels.

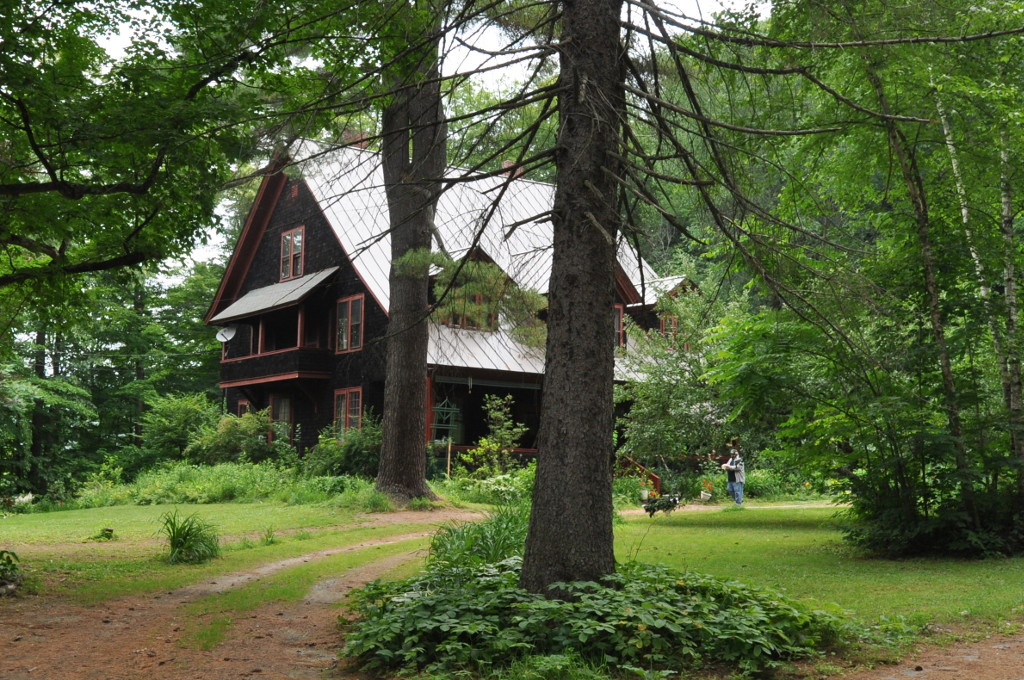
Gate of the Hills, Waller's residence in Bethel, Vermont

== Biography ==
Waller was born in Boston, Massachusetts, in 1855. Her mother was Mary Doane Hallet of Cape Cod and her father was David Waller of Vermont. In 1867, Waller's father and only sibling died. This necessitated Waller being taken out of school to earn her own living. For the four years following this tragedy, her mother took the twelve year old Mary traveling around Europe, where she became fluent in German, French and Italian.

Upon their return, Waller began teaching at an exclusive Boston finishing school, Mrs. Shaw's school, before leaving to take a teaching position at Brearley School in New York. Following this, Waller then founded her own school in Chicago, Miss Waller's School for Girls.

== Writing career ==
Forced by ill health to give up her school, Waller wrote her first novel in 1902, The Little Citizen. She lived in Bethel, Vermont with her mother at a historic house called Gate of the Hills until 1918. Many of her novels were written in and set in Vermont.

Her earliest works were her most successful. A Daughter of the Rich (1903), The Wood-Carver of 'Lympus (1904), and Sanna (1905) ran through more than a dozen editions each. The Wood-Carver of 'Lympus was a bestseller of the day while Through the Gates of the Netherlands received praise from critics:

One of the most delightful of the holiday books of travel is Miss Waller's Through the Gates of the Netherlands. It is a thoroughly enjoyable record, half story, half traveler's diary, of some memorable months spent in Holland and the Netherlands. The author writes interestingly and easily of the people and their customs, of famous buildings and places of historic interest, and especially of the Dutch painters and their work. She personally visited many of the scenes immortalised in Dutch masterpieces and sought out the sources of inspiration of many of the masters ... the book is beautifully illustrated with numerous full page pictures in sepia, most of them reproductions of famous masterpieces by Dutch painters. The volume would make an ideal holiday gift.

Waller was a social Darwinist in outlook; seeing life as a competition in which the fittest succeed. However, this did not prevent her expressing sympathy with the downtrodden in her writings. Though she continued to write and publish works into her old age, the popularity of Waller's particular brand of fiction declined after World War One with the public and critics alike.

== Notable works ==
- The Rose-bush of Hildesheim (1889)
- Giotto's Sheep (1889)
- From an Island Outpost
- The Little Citizen (1902)
- Sanna: A Novel
- Out of the Silences
- Through the Gates of the Netherlands (1906)
- The Wood-Carver of 'Lympus (1904)
- A Cry in the Wilderness
- My Ragpicker (1911)
- A daughter of the rich
- Aunt Dorcas's Change of Heart (1913)
- The windmill on the dune (1931).
- Deep in the Hearts of Men. A novel (1924)
- Flamsted Quarries (1910)
- A year out of life
- Our Benny

Not content with writing over twenty novels, Waller also patented a foot warmer.

== Death ==
Waller died at the age of 83 in Wellesley, Massachusetts, in 1938.
