= Ella Catliff =

Model and blogger

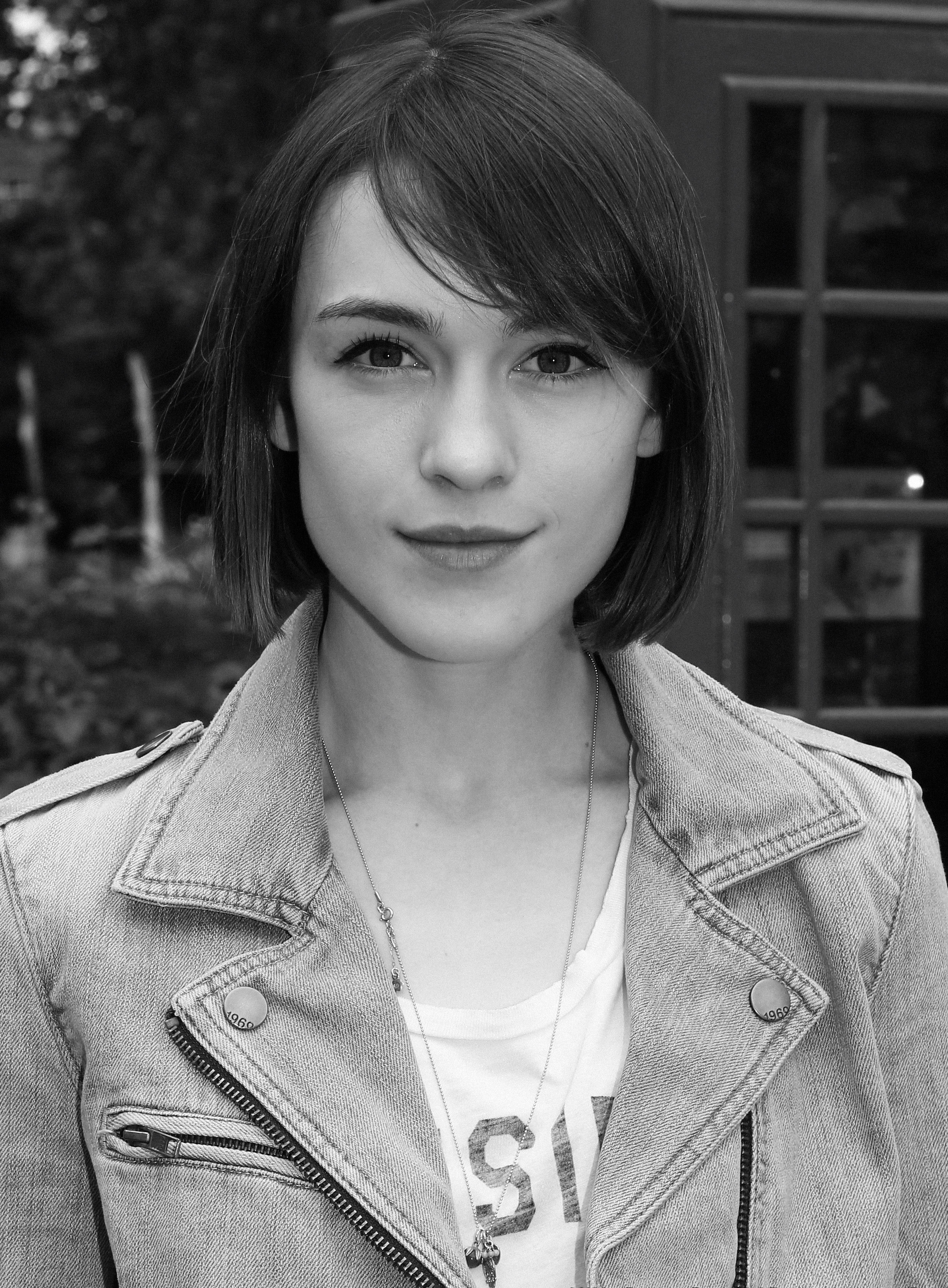
- Catliff in 2013
- Born: 19 June 1991 (age 35)
- Citizenship: British
- Education: Central Saint Martins College of Arts and Design
- Occupations: Model; blogger
- Website: La Petite Anglaise

Ella Catliff (born 19 June 1991) is a London-based English model and blogger, who writes about fashion and style in her blog called La Petite Anglaise, which started in May 2010.

Verge magazine said her "personal style has quickly gained an impressive global following." Celebrity Red Carpet said she "is fast becoming one to watch in the most hyped fashion circles of London."

Catliff grew up in West London and Sussex. She attended Central Saint Martins College of Arts and Design, BA where she graduated with a First in fashion history and theory in July 2014.
