= Ella G. Sonkin =

American folklorist

- Born: Ella Goldberg; 8 April 1903; New Haven, Connecticut, U.S.
- Died: 14 August 1984 (aged 81); Palo Alto, California, U.S.
- Spouse: Simon Sonkin (m. 1925; died 1965)

Ella G. Sonkin (April 8, 1903 – August 14, 1984) was an American folklorist, folk dance organizer, and educator active in the mid-20th century. Based primarily in New York City during the 1930s and 1940s, she served as director of the City Folk Dance Society and played a significant role in the promotion and teaching of American square dance and international folk dance in urban settings.

In addition to her organizational work, Sonkin contributed to national folk dance publications and wrote on the pedagogy, organization, and cultural context of folk and country dancing. From the late 1940s onward, she was also active in California, where she directed institutes, conducted research on traditional folk costumes, and engaged with the folk dance community through lectures and writing.

== Early life and education ==
Ella G. Sonkin was born Ella Goldberg on April 8, 1903, in New Haven, Connecticut.

== Career ==
=== New York and early career ===
By the mid-1930s, Sonkin was active in New York City as a music educator and author, publishing instructional materials for children. In June 1936, Sonkin served as a judge at New York City’s first municipal folk dance contest for children, organized by the New York City Department of Parks and held in Central Park. Acting in her capacity as a member of the Folk Festival Council, she evaluated performances representing a wide range of cultural traditions from across the city’s five boroughs.

Sonkin represented the United States at the International Folk Dance Festival and Congress held in Stockholm, Sweden, in 1939, August 1-6. During the festival, she produced a documentary film record of participating folk dance groups, later catalogued in professional dance and film literature. Although the film is documented in contemporary sources, no surviving copy has been identified in public film archives.

On December 12, 1939, Sonkin led the Society for Jewish Folk Dance and Song in a session of the New School for Social Research’s series “Folk Dances and Songs of Many Peoples. The program featured dance traditions from a wide range of ethnic communities represented in New York.

By the early 1940s, Sonkin was contributing to national folk dance publications. In 1941, she authored an article in Promenade, the official publication of the American Square Dance Group, in which she discussed the challenges of organizing folk and square dance activities in urban settings and outlined pedagogical principles for leading successful community dances.

In 1942, Sonkin was listed as a member of the faculty at the annual convention of the Dancing Masters of America, where instruction covered a range of dance forms including folk dance and children’s work.

In 1943, The New York Times listed Sonkin as director of the City Folk Dance Group, leading weekly American square and international folk dance sessions at Carnegie Hall in New York City.

By 1944, Sonkin was serving as director of the City Folk Dance Society in New York City. Contemporary coverage noted that the organization began its season that year at its headquarters at Studio 306, 9 East 59th Street, where Sonkin oversaw regular folk dance sessions. She remained active at the same location throughout 1945, with listings in both national and regional folk and square dance periodicals identifying her as leading regular square and folk dance activities and organizing themed international events under the society’s auspices.

=== Postwar activities in California ===
In 1947, Sonkin was identified in regional press as National Chairman of Folk Dance, corresponding from New York with state-level music and dance federations and encouraging the development and federation of youth folk dance groups. During the same period, she was also active as an instructor in the New York folk dance scene. That year, a folk dance group associated with the University of Texas reported that one of its organizers had studied under Sonkin, alongside other instructors active in New York, including Michael Herman.

A notice published in Let’s Dance, the journal of the Folk Dance Federation of California, reports that Sonkin spent the summer of 1948 in the San Francisco Bay Area, where she participated in folk dance activities with local clubs.

In April 1949, Sonkin directed an Institute on Folk Dancing at Santa Barbara College under the University of California Extension. Press coverage described her as an internationally known folk dance authority and emphasized her focus on stylistic accuracy, cultural characteristics, and traditional costume. The institute was presented as part of a broader program of folk dance education sponsored by academic and civic organizations.

In 1949, Sonkin traveled to Switzerland to conduct research on traditional folk costumes, a trip acknowledged in Let’s Dance, where she was cited as a source of information following her visit from New York.

In May 1949, Sonkin contributed an article as a guest writer to Let’s Dance, discussing differences between Eastern and Western approaches to folk dance and emphasizing the importance of cultural authenticity. Later that year, following her research in Switzerland, Sonkin participated in the Fourth Annual Statewide Folk and Square Dance Festival in Santa Barbara, where she gave an informal talk on costume authenticity in folk dance.

In June 1950, Sonkin incorporated film into her work by screening a series of 16 mm films at a folk dance event in San Carlos, California. Contemporary press described the films as documentary in nature and depicting folk dances of peasant communities from multiple countries. At the time, Sonkin was noted for combining teaching with research on folk dance and traditional costume, while continuing to serve as director of city folk dancing in New York City.

In April 1952, contemporary Estonian-language press in New York documents that Sonkin publicly screened short films of international folk dances, including footage from the 1939 International Folk Dance Festival in Stockholm, where an Estonian dance group led by Ullo Toomi performed. According to the report, the film screening was followed by a live folk dance instruction session led by Sonkin, confirming her role as both a presenter and educator of international folk dance traditions in the early 1950s.

By 1955, Sonkin was active in Palo Alto, California, where she continued to engage publicly with the folk and square dance community.

In 1960, Sonkin was listed as a member of the National Advisory Committee of the National Folk Festival Association. Contemporary archival records identify her as a folk dance teacher affiliated with Stanford University, reflecting her continued involvement in national-level folk culture initiatives during the postwar period. The committee included scholars, educators, and cultural leaders from across the United States and advised on the artistic and educational direction of the annual National Folk Festival.

In 1968, the Estonian-language newspaper Vaba Eesti Sõna reported that Sonkin continued to teach Estonian folk dances in the United States. The article noted that dances she had learned earlier from Alice Zimmermann were transmitted through Sonkin to American teachers and subsequently performed publicly during Estonian Independence Day celebrations.

=== International work and film documentation ===
In August 1939, Sonkin represented the United States at the International Folk Dance Festival and Congress in Stockholm, Sweden, an international gathering devoted to the study and preservation of traditional dance and music.

During the festival, Sonkin filmed participating groups on 16 mm color film. The resulting documentary, titled International Folk Dance Festival and Congress, was later listed as entry no. 227 in A Catalogue of Dance Films (1945), edited by George H. Amberg and published in Dance Index under the auspices of the Museum of Modern Art.

The resulting 16 mm color film, titled International Folk Dance Festival and Congress, was catalogued in 1945 in A Catalogue of Dance Films, published in Dance Index under the auspices of the Museum of Modern Art.

During the late 1940s and early 1950s, Sonkin continued to use the film in educational contexts. In 1950, she publicly screened 16 mm documentary films depicting folk dances of peasant communities from multiple countries in California, and in 1952 she presented footage from the 1939 Stockholm festival at a folk dance event in New York City.

Although the film is documented in professional dance and film literature, no surviving copy has been identified in public film archives.

== Personal life ==
Ella Sonkin was married to Simon Sonkin and was the mother of two daughters. Her husband, Simon Sonkin, was a physicist who served as a professor of physics at Stanford University and previously as chairman of the physics department at the City College of New York.

A member of Congregation Kol Emeth in Palo Alto, she died on August 14, 1984, in Stanford, California.

== Works ==
- Sonkin, Ella G.; Bregman, Sophie (1935). Let's Sing Mother Goose, with New Tunes. New York: Harold Flammer, Inc. OCLC 2608930
- Sonkin, Ella G.; Bregman, Sophie (1935). Let's Sing Mother Goose!. New York: Harold Flammer, Inc. OCLC 31085546
- Sonkin, Ella G. (1943). "American Country Dancing: Facts and Fallacies." The Country Dancer, vol. 3, no. 3/4.

== Legacy ==
A collection of ethnographic objects from the Hawaiian Islands collected by Ella G. Sonkin and donated by Rhoda Alvarez is held at the Phoebe A. Hearst Museum of Anthropology, University of California, Berkeley. The collection includes traditional lei (ceremonial garlands used as personal adornment) made of paper, as well as several rattle instruments made from bamboo, gourds, and vegetal materials, used in both secular and ritual musical contexts.
