= Ella =

Ella is a feminine given name or surname.

Ella (or similar) may also refer to:

== Places ==
=== United States ===
- Ella, Kentucky, an unincorporated community
- Ella, Oregon, an unincorporated community
- Ella, Pennsylvania, an unincorporated community
- Ella, Wisconsin, an unincorporated community
- Lake Ella, Tallahassee, Florida

=== Greenland ===
- Ella Island, an uninhabited island of the Greenland Sea, Greenland

=== Sri Lanka ===
- Ella, Sri Lanka, a town in Uva Province, Sri Lanka

=== United Kingdom ===
- East Ella, a suburb of Hull
- Kirk Ella, village and parish in the East Riding of Yorkshire
- West Ella, in Kirk Ella parish

== Arts and entertainment ==
=== Musicians ===
- Ella Fitzgerald (born 1917), sometimes referred to as "Lady Ella"
- Ella (Brazilian singer) (born 1997)
- Ella (Malaysian singer) (born 1966)
- Ella Gross (born 2008), known mononymously as Ella, member of South Korean girl group Meovv

=== Albums ===
- Ella (Ella Fitzgerald album), 1969
- Ella (Juan Gabriel album), 1980

=== Songs ===
- "Ella" (song), a 1942 song by José Alfredo Jiménez
- "Ella", a 1973 song by Jack de Nijs
- "Ella", song by Raphael, 1969
- "Ella", song by The Way, 1972
- "Ella", song by Bebe from Pafuera Telarañas, 2004
- "Ella", song by Argentine group Tan Biónica, 2010
- "Ella", song by Álvaro Soler from Mar de colores, 2017

=== Other ===
- The title character of Ella the Elephant, a Canadian animated preschool series
- Ella, 2016 documentary film about Australian dancer Ella Havelka
- Ella (film), 2024 Hindi film directed by Roshan Fernandes, and its titular character
- Ella (novel), by Uri Geller

== Other uses ==
- ELLA (programming language), hardware design language
- 435 Ella, a Main belt asteroid
- Tropical Storm Ella (disambiguation), several tropical storms
- USS Ella, various United States Navy ships
- Ella, trade name in the US of ulipristal acetate, an emergency contraceptive

== See also ==
- "Ella, elle l'a", a 1987 song by France Gall
- Several settlements near Kingston upon Hull, Yorkshire, England, United Kingdom:
  - East Ella
  - Kirk Ella
  - West Ella
- Elah (disambiguation)
- Aelle (disambiguation)
