= Listed buildings in Kirk Ella =

Kirk Ella is a civil parish in the county of the East Riding of Yorkshire, England. It contains 33 listed buildings that are recorded in the National Heritage List for England. Of these, one is listed at Grade I, the highest of the three grades, and the others are at Grade II, the lowest grade. The parish is immediately to the west of the city of Hull, and also includes the village of West Ella. It is mainly residential, almost all the listed buildings are houses and associated structures, and the others consist of a church and a chest tomb in the churchyard.

== Key ==
Grade	Criteria
I	Buildings of exceptional interest, sometimes considered to be internationally important
II	Buildings of national importance and special interest

== Buildings ==
Name and location	Photograph	Date	Notes	Grade
St Andrew's Church; 53.75398°N 0.45408°W		Early 13th century	The church has been altered and enlarged through the centuries, including a restoration in 1882–83, and the addition of the choir vestry in 1894. It is built in stone, partly rendered, with an ornamental slate roof, and consists of a nave with a clerestory, north and south aisles, north and south porches, a chancel and a south chapel, and a west tower with a north vestry. The tower has three stages, a high plinth, diagonal buttresses, a pointed west doorway above which is a three-light pointed window with a hood mould, and a canopied niche with a statue, The bell openings have three lights under a four-centred arch. On the south front is a clock face, and above the west bell opening is a buttress flanked by gargoyles, above which is an embattled parapet with eight crocketed pinnacles.	I
4 Church Lane; 53.75332°N 0.45421°W	—	Mid-18th century	The house is in rendered and colourwashed brick, and has a pantile roof with raised gables. There are two storeys and three bays. The right bay projects slightly, and contains a Doric porch with an entablature, and a doorway containing a fanlight with radial glazing. Above and to the left are sash windows in architraves.	II
256 West Ella Road; 53.74931°N 0.47272°W	—	Mid-18th century	The house, which was Gothicised in the early 19th century is in colourwashed pebbledashed brick, and has a pantile roof with raised gables. There is a single storey, a recessed range to the right, and a porch with a doorway in the angle. The windows are horizontal sliding sashes with latticed glazing.	II
West Ella Hall; 53.74956°N 0.46810°W	—	Mid-18th century	The house, which has been extended, is stuccoed and colourwashed, with stone dressings, timber eaves cornices and slate roof. The original part has two storeys, an L-shaped plan and four storeys, and a rear wing on the right. There are rusticated quoins, a projecting square porch, two-storey canted bay windows and sash windows. The rear wing has been extended to nine bays. The block added in 1884 has two storeys, four bays, a plinth a moulded sill band, a dentilled eaves cornice and a hipped roof. The windows are sashes with segmental gauged brick arches and fluted keystones, those on the upper floor with aprons.	II
Gate, gate piers and walls, West Ella Hall; 53.75010°N 0.46869°W		Mid-18th century	The gateway is in red brick, with stone dressings, and consists of a central elliptical arch with a raised keystone, under a parapet with a central raised panel. This is flanked by piers with cornices and ball finials, and screen walls with round-headed blank arches and stone imposts under parapets, outside which are smaller piers with ball finials. The gates are in cast iron and have rosettes and ramped top rails.	II
The Ancient Manor House; 53.74854°N 0.47121°W	—	1753	The house, which was Gothicised in the early 19th century, is in colourwashed pebbledashed brick, with pantile roofs, a raised coped gable on the right and hipped on the left. There is a single storey with attics, an L-shaped plan, and two bays on the front. In the centre is a two-storey gabled porch with ornamental bargeboards, a pointed chamfered arch with a hood mould, and above is an oblong window with latticed glazing. To the left is a canted bay window, and to the right is a horizontally sliding sash window under a tiled timber canopy. Above is a gabled roof dormer.	II
The Old Hall; 53.75342°N 0.45309°W		c. 1760	A large house in stuccoed red brick, with roofs of Welsh slate and pantile, and two storeys. The garden front has nine bays, a single-storey three-bay extension to the right, and a later rear extension. The front has a string course, a cornice, and a plain parapet with balustraded panels. In the centre is a porch with Doric columns and an entablature, and a doorway with a fanlight and an archivolt. This is flanked by two-storey bay windows, and the other windows are sashes in corniced architraves. The rear, facing the road, has twelve bays, and a three-bay wing on the left. The windows are sashes, those on the upper floor with shaped aprons.	II
Former garden walls, West Ella Hall; 53.74923°N 0.46868°W	—	c. 1770	The walls are in red brick with stone dressings and copings. They are regularly punctuated by piers with ball finials. In the wall is a pair of gate piers about 15 feet (4.6 m) in height, between which is a wrought iron gate.	II
254 West Ella Road; 53.74941°N 0.47230°W	—	Late 18th century	The house, which was Gothicised in the early 19th century, is in colourwashed pebbledashed brick, with a stepped eaves cornice, and a pantile roof with coped gables. There are two storeys and two bays. In the centre is a gabled porch, and the windows are horizontal sliding sashes in architraves.	II
262 West Ella Road; 53.74914°N 0.47350°W	—	Late 18th century	The house, which was Gothicised and extended in the early to mid-19th century, is in colourwashed pebbledashed brick, with bracketed eaves and a pantile roof with raised gables. The main range has two storeys and three bays, and it is flanked by single-storey two-bay wings. The porch has a raised coped gable and a doorway. The wings have dentiled brick eaves cornices, and the windows in all parts are casements with latticed glazing.	II
Kirk Ella Hall; 53.75462°N 0.45845°W		Late 18th century	A house, later a golf clubhouse, in yellow brick, with stone dressings, a floor band, a moulded cornice, a coped parapet, and a hipped slate roof. There are two storeys and seven bays, the middle three bays projecting slightly. In the centre is a projecting Tuscan doorway with a balustered parapet and a doorway with a fanlight, flanked by sash windows under wedge lintels. Above the porch is a tripartite window flanked by attached Tuscan columns with sidelights and Tuscan pilasters. On the garden front is a Tuscan porch flanked by two-storey canted bay windows.	II
Swan Cottage; 53.74904°N 0.47387°W	—	Late 18th century	The house is in rendered and colourwashed brick, and has a pantile roof raised coped gables and brick kneelers. There is a single storey, with attics on the central range, and an irregular plan. Facing the road is a gabled bay with an attic, a single-storey range to the right, and a lean to extension on the left. The porch has a pointed chamfered opening, and most of the windows are horizontally sliding sashes with latticed glazing.	II
Wolfreton Hall and Wolfreton Grange; 53.75539°N 0.44954°W	—	Late 18th century	The house, divided into two, was refronted in about 1810. It is in red brick, the refronting in white brick, with dressings in brick and stone, a sill band, a floor band, a moulded eaves cornice, and hipped slate roofs. There are three storeys and seven bays, the outer three bays on each side canted through the full height of the house. In the centre is a Doric porch with a segmental pediment. The windows are sashes, on the lower two floors under cambered gauged brick arches.	II
Kirk Ella House and garage 53.75359°N 0.45204°W		1779	The house and coach house, later a garage, are in painted stuccoed brick on a plinth, with stone dressings, a sill band, a moulded cornice, and a hipped Westmorland slate roof. The house has two storeys, five bays and a two-bay extension to the left. The middle bay of the original range projects slightly under a pediment, and contains a doorway with flanking sash windows in architraves under a bracketed hood. Above it is a two-light mullioned window with pilasters and a cornice, and the other windows are sashes. A single bay on the left links the house to the garage, which projects, and has a garage door, pilasters, an entablature and a pediment.	II
Wolfreton House; 53.75272°N 0.44710°W	—	c. 1810	The house is in yellow brick, with stone dressings, a bracketed eaves cornice, a hipped slate roof, and two storeys. The garden front has four bays, a plinth, a sill band and a floor band, and it contains sash windows with cambered wedge lintels. The entrance front has two bays, the left bay containing a full-height canted bay window. The projecting porch has unfluted Doric columns and a pediment, and contains a doorway with a round-headed architrave with a roundel and a keystone.	II
Stable block, Wolfreton House; 53.75295°N 0.44721°W	—	c. 1810	The stable block is in white brick on a plinth, with stone dressings and a hipped slate roof. The main range has two storeys and six bays, with single-bay flanking wings under lean-to roofs. The middle two bays project under a pediment with stone copings and kneelers. On the ground floor is a blocked doorway under a wedge lintel, over which are three oculi. The outer bays contain doorways with fanlights, and sash windows under cambered wedge lintels. On the roof is a cupola with round-headed lights and attached Tuscan colonnettes, a cornice, and a lead dome with a ball finial and a weathervane.	II
Chest tomb of Jane Whitaker; 53.75360°N 0.45476°W		1815	The chest tomb is in the churchyard of St Andrew's Church, to the southwest of the church. It is in sandstone, and has a broad plinth, on which is a chest with projecting panels on the sides. On this is a sarcophagus with a scalloped lid, sunk panels to the sides, and fluted corners. It stands on claw feet, and on it are inscriptions.	II
266 West Ella Road; 53.74899°N 0.47412°W	—	Early 19th century	The house is in colourwashed pebbledashed brick with a pantile roof. There are two storeys and a single bay, with a single-bay lean-to extension on the right. To the left is a projecting gabled porch, and to the right and on the extension are horizontally sliding sashes with latticed glazing.	II
268 West Ella Road; 53.74895°N 0.47422°W	—	Early 19th century	The house is in colourwashed pebbledashed brick with oversailing eaves and a pantile roof. There is one storey and attics, two bays, and a lean-to extension on the left. In the centre is a two-storey gabled porch with a pointed opening. Above the opening, flanking the porch, and on the extension are horizontally sliding sash windows with latticed glazing.	II
Trevayne; 53.75335°N 0.45400°W		c. 1830–40	The house, later used for other purposes, is in colourwashed pebbledashed brick on a chamfered plinth, with rusticated quoins, and slate roofs with coped gables. There are five sections, the first, originally a coach house, has a doorway with a rusticated surround, over which is a two-light window, both with hood moulds, a small oblong window, and a gable with a finial. The second section has a four-centred arch over which is a small oriel window, and a crow-stepped gable. On the third section are three windows, over which is a decorated panel, all with hood moulds. The fourth section projects, and has rusticated quoins, and a three-light window, over which is a two-light window and a single-light window, all with hood moulds, and a gable on shaped kneelers. The fifth section has two bays and two storeys, a doorway with a pointed arch on the left bay, to the right is a three-light window, both with hood moulds, the upper floor contains two-light windows, and all the openings have rusticated surrounds.	II
231 West Ella Road; 53.74885°N 0.47291°W		Early to mid-19th century	The house is in colourwashed pebbledashed brick, with corner buttresses, and a pantile roof with a raised gable on the left. There are two storeys and two bays. In the centre is a projecting two-storey porch with a raised coped gable on kneelers, and a round-arched entrance. To its right is a canted bay window, and the other windows are casements. All the windows have latticed glazing.	II
233 West Ella Road; 53.74882°N 0.47304°W		Early to mid-19th century	The house is in colourwashed pebbledashed brick, with corner buttresses, and a pantile roof with a raised gable on the right. There are two storeys and two bays. In the centre is a gabled porch and a doorway with a segmental arch. Most of the windows are horizontally sliding sashes, one with a hood mould, and there are two inserted 20th-century windows.	II
235 West Ella Road; 53.74862°N 0.47357°W	—	Early to mid-19th century	The house is in colourwashed pebbledashed brick with a pantile roof. There is a single storey and attics, two bays, and a lean-to on the left. On the right is a projecting porch, and the windows are horizontally sliding sashes, one with a hood mould. Above is a roof dormer with a casement window. All these windows have latticed glazing. On the lean-to is an oblong window.	II
237 West Ella Road; 53.74869°N 0.47363°W	—	Early to mid-19th century	The house is in colourwashed pebbledashed brick, with overhanging eaves and a pantile roof. There is a single storey and attics, and two bays. On the left is a two-storey porch with a pointed entrance and a window above. To the right is a window, and above is a roof dormer; all the windows are casements with latticed glazing.	II
246 West Ella Road; 53.74984°N 0.47097°W	—	Early to mid-19th century	The house is in colourwashed pebbledashed brick, with rusticated quoins, overhanging eaves with bargeboards, and a pantile roof. There are two storeys and two bays, the left bay projecting under a gable. The porch has a pointed opening with a rusticated surround, and to the right are oblong windows, the lower with a hood mould. To the left are casement windows, the upper with a hood mould; the windows have latticed glazing.	II
248 West Ella Road and barn 53.74956°N 0.47169°W	—	Early to mid-19th century	The house is in colourwashed pebbledashed brick, with oversailing eaves and a pantile roof with a crested ridge. There are two storeys and two bays. On the left is a projecting porch flanked by octagonal turrets, and quatrefoils above, and on the upper floor is a two-light casement window. To the right is a two-storey canted bay window under a gable with decorative bargeboards. To the rear, extending along the road, is a range with two storeys and four bays under a slate roof. It contains a timber porch flanked by small canted bay windows, and elsewhere are casement windows. Beyond it is a lower two-storey three-bay barn with a doorway, casement windows, and a pantile roof with a raised coped gable and a finial.	II
272 West Ella Road; 53.74894°N 0.47459°W	—	Early to mid-19th century	The house is in colourwashed pebbledashed brick with oversailing eaves and a pantile roof. There is a single storey with attics, two bays, a two-storey gabled porch to the right, and a single-storey lean-to on the left. The porch has a four-centred arched head and a hood mould, above which is a blank panel. Over it, and on the left bay, are horizontally sliding sash windows with latticed glazing.	II
11 Packman Lane; 53.75415°N 0.45564°W		1838	A lodge to Kirk Ella Hall, later a private house, in colourwashed pebbledashed brick, with stone dressings, oversailing eaves and a slate roof. There is a single storey and attic, two bays and a gabled cross-wing to the right with a bargeboard. On the left is a projecting gabled porch that has a four-centred arch with foliage in the spandrels, and a stepped hood mould containing an inscribed and dated shield, and to its right is a cross-mullioned window. The cross-wing has a canted bay window, above which is a small oblong window.	II
The Vicarage; 53.75331°N 0.45337°W		1839	The vicarage, later used for other purposes, is in red brick, with stone dressings, angle and intermediate buttresses rising to octagonal pinnacles, and a Welsh slate roof with stepped gables containing slit windows, with stone coping and finials. There are two storeys and three bays, the left bay recessed, The porch on the middle bay has diagonal buttresses, a Tudor arched doorway with a hood mould, and a gable with a finial containing a dated shield. The windows are mullioned with quoined surrounds, and between the windows on the right bay is a panel with shield and ribbon motifs. At the rear is a small loggia with two pointed arches.	II
Outbuilding, The Vicarage; 53.75335°N 0.45370°W	—	1839 (probable)	A coach house and stable, later used for other purposes, it is in red brick on a chamfered plinth with a Welsh slate roof. There are two storeys, one bay on the front and two on the left return. The bay facing the street is gabled and coped, with an apex finial, and corner finials with grotesques. In the ground floor are two slit windows, and above is a square hatch, all with chamfered surrounds. On the return is a window under a Tudor arch, and to the left is a stable door and a casement window.	II
217 West Ella Road; 53.74912°N 0.47182°W		Mid-19th century	The house is in red brick, with white brick dressings, quoins, oversailing eaves with ornamental bargeboards, and a slate roof. There are two storeys, a main range and a gabled cross-wing to the right. The main range has a plain door and a rustic verandah. On the ground floor of the cross-wing is a canted bay window, and above is a two-light casement window with quoined jambs and a hood mould. The windows have latticed glazing.	II
252 West Ella Road; 53.74946°N 0.47223°W	—	Mid-19th century	The house is in red and yellow brick, with quoins and a tile roof. There are two storeys and one bay. The end facing the road has a gable with fretted bargeboards. On the ground floor is a canted bay window, and above is two-light mullioned casement window with a hood mould. On the right return is a gabled porch.	II
229 West Ella Road; 53.74898°N 0.47264°W		1864	The house is in colourwashed pebbledashed brick, and has a slate roof with raised coped gables and plain kneelers. There are two bays, the left with one storey, containing a projecting gabled porch with a pointed arch. The right bay has two storeys, it projects and is gabled with a finial. The ground floor window has mullions and transoms and four lights, and the upper window has mullions and three lights, and a hood mould; both have latticed glazing.	II
