= Wyke College =

Sixth Form College in Kingston upon Hull, East Riding of Yorkshire, England

Wyke Sixth Form College
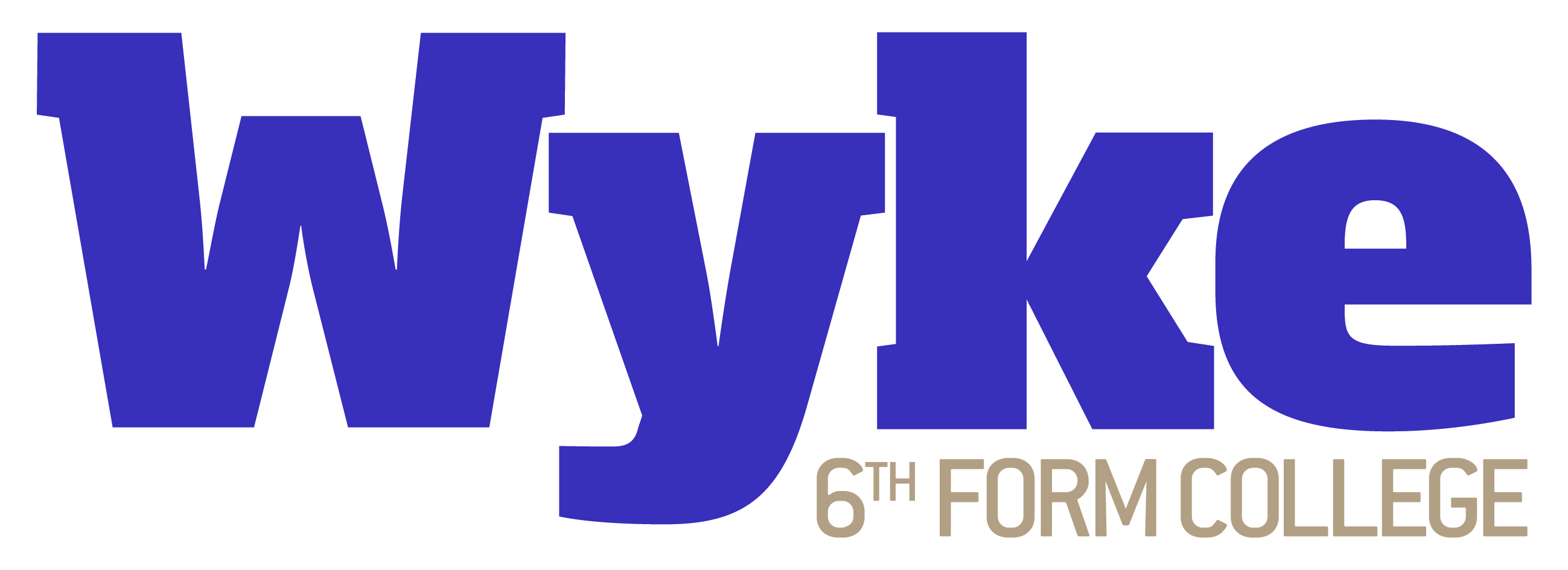

Location
- Bricknell Avenue; Kingston upon Hull, East Riding of Yorkshire, HU5 4NT; England; 53.76412°N 0.38926°W

Information
- Other name: Wyke College
- Type: Sixth form college
- Established: 1988
- Local authority: Hull City Council
- Department for Education URN: 130581 Tables
- Ofsted: Reports
- Chairman: John Wilson
- Head teacher: Julie Peaks
- Gender: Mixed
- Age range: 16–19
- Enrolment: 2,207 (2019)
- Colour: Purple
- Buildings: 4
- Website: wyke.ac.uk

Wyke Sixth Form College is a sixth form college in Kingston upon Hull, England.

== History ==
The college opened in 1988 and purports to be the largest A-level provider in the city. Over £3 million was spent on facilities before the college opened. Its campus comprises four buildings which include a library and learning resource centre, canteen, sports facilities and classrooms. The college offers a variety of Level 2 and Level 3 courses, including A-Levels and BTEC qualifications.

An October 2023 Ofsted inspection report rated the college as 'Outstanding' across all categories.

== Facilities ==
A £2 million facility known as the 'Wilson building' was opened in 2005 and served as the catalyst of a £20 million project that would be completed in May 2010.

Later on, a £7 million centre known as the Ash building was opened in October 2008. This was the second of three buildings that formed as part of the renovation works. The building would house science, art, humanities, information and communication technology, health and social care and modern foreign languages courses, and would include 36 teaching spaces and two learning resource areas. The building was designed to be as environmentally friendly as possible, with temperature controls throughout and ground-source pumps that would circulate water constantly around the building from forty 100-metre deep bore-holes, which would either provide or remove heat according to the season.

The project was funded by the college with significant investment from the British Government through the Learning and Skills Council. The Government paid for 80 per cent of the building costs.

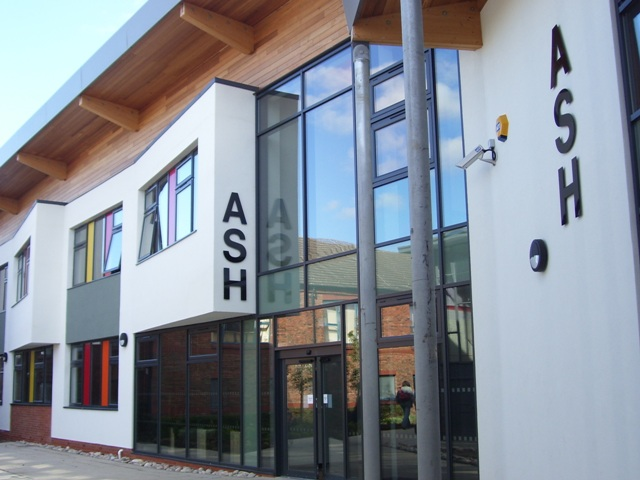
The Ash building, 2008

In May 2010, following three years of planning and construction, the £20 million project was completed following the construction of the 'Oak building', as well as facilities including an outdoor area, sports hall and a purpose built theatre and auditorium.

== Results ==
313 students who entered for A-Level examinations in 1996 achieved scores which placed the college among the top third of colleges within the further education sector.

In August 2011, the college secured 100 per cent pass rates in 34 subjects, while almost half of the passes achieved were in the higher grades of A*, A or B. At AS level the pass rate was 89.4 per cent, a 5.3 per cent improvement on 2010.

In August 2017, the college achieved a 99.6% A-Level pass rate, as well as a 100% pass rate across 29 subjects with the proportion of students achieving A* to B grades being 47%. A total of 97 students managed to achieve an A* grade, with fifty of those achieving at least three grades at A* or A. 62 students studying BTEC courses at the college also secured three triple distinctions.

== Notable alumni ==
College alumni include:

- MP for Hull West and Hessle, Emma Hardy
- Author Edward Jarvis
- MP for Brigg and Goole, Andrew Percy
- Actor Mark Pickering
- Chinese-English cellist Gay-Yee Westerhoff
- Comedian Lucy Beaumont
- Actor Robert Aramayo
