= Kingston upon Hull West and Haltemprice =

UK Parliament constituency (since 2024)

Coordinates: 53.74°N 0.41°W

- Borough constituency for the House of Commons
- Interactive map of boundaries since 2024
- Boundary within Yorkshire and the Humber
- County: East Riding of Yorkshire

Current constituency
- Created: 2024
- Member of Parliament: Emma Hardy (Labour)
- Seats: One
- Created from: Kingston upon Hull West and Hessle & Haltemprice and Howden (part)

Kingston upon Hull West and Haltemprice is a constituency of the House of Commons in the UK Parliament. It was established by the 2023 review of Westminster constituencies and is currently represented by Emma Hardy of the Labour Party. Hardy was previously the MP for the predecessor constituency of Kingston upon Hull West and Hessle from 2017 to 2024.

== Constituency profile ==
Kingston upon Hull West and Haltemprice is a constituency in the East Riding of Yorkshire. It covers the city centre of Kingston upon Hull, more commonly known simply as Hull, and the neighbourhoods in the west of the city including Gipsyville and East Ella. The constituency also covers the area of Haltemprice which lies outside the city's boundaries and includes the town of Hessle and the connected villages of Willerby, Anlaby and Kirk Ella. Kingston-upon-Hull is an industrial city based at the confluence of the River Hull and the Humber estuary and has been an important port city for around 800 years. The city has been described as an "up and coming" place to live. Hessle has a history of shipbuilding and is the location of the Humber Bridge which connects the area to Lincolnshire. This is the wealthier of the city's three constituencies, although there is significant deprivation in the centre of Hull and in Gipsyville, which fall within the top 10% most-deprived areas in England. Haltemprice is generally affluent and suburban in character. House prices in the constituency are similar to the rest of Yorkshire and lower than the national average.

On average, residents of the constituency have low levels of education, income and professional employment. A high proportion work in retail and business administration. White people made up 92% of the population at the 2021 census. At the local council level, the parts of the constituency within Hull are mostly represented by Labour Party councillors, Hessle and Anlaby by Liberal Democrats and Willerby and Kirk Ella by Conservatives. Voters strongly supported leaving the European Union in the 2016 referendum; an estimated 65% voted in favour of Brexit compared to the nationwide figure of 52%.

== Boundaries ==
The constituency is composed of the following (as they existed on 1 December 2020):

- The District of East Riding of Yorkshire wards of Hessle, Tranby, and Willerby & Kirk Ella.
- The City of Kingston upon Hull wards of Boothferry, Derringham, Newington & Gipsyville, Pickering, and St Andrew's & Docklands.

The seat comprises the following areas of former constituencies:

- The majority of the abolished Kingston upon Hull West and Hessle constituency
- The villages of Anlaby, Kirk Ella, West Ella and Willerby, previously in the constituency of Haltemprice and Howden (abolished)

== Members of Parliament ==
Kingston upon Hull West and Hessle prior to 2024

Election	Member	Party
2024	Emma Hardy	Labour

=== Elections in the 2020s ===
General election 2024: Kingston upon Hull West and Haltemprice
Party	Candidate	Votes	%	±%
Labour	Emma Hardy	17,875	46.8	+13.0
Reform UK	Julie Peck	8,896	23.3	+9.8
Conservative	Rachel Storer	6,924	18.1	−24.4
Liberal Democrats	Linda Johnson	2,625	6.9	−2.3
Green	Kevin Paulson	1,748	4.6	+3.5
SDP	Lucy Needham	110	0.3	N/A
Majority		8,979	23.5	
Turnout		38,178	52.1	−3.9
Registered electors		73,252		
Labour hold		Swing	+1.6	

- Notional gain from the Conservative Party under new boundaries

=== Elections in the 2010s ===
2019 notional result
Party	Vote	%
Conservative	17,686	42.5
Labour	14,060	33.8
Brexit Party	5,606	13.5
Liberal Democrats	3,837	9.2
Green	442	1.1
Turnout	41,631	56.0
Electorate	74,321	

== See also ==
- Parliamentary constituencies in Humberside
- List of parliamentary constituencies in the Yorkshire and the Humber (region)
