= Listed buildings in Swanland =

Swanland is a civil parish in the county of the East Riding of Yorkshire, England. It contains nine listed buildings that are recorded in the National Heritage List for England. All the listed buildings are designated at Grade II, the lowest of the three grades, which is applied to "buildings of national importance and special interest". The parish contains the village of Swanland and the surrounding area. All the listed buildings are in the village, and consist of houses, cottages, a church and a telephone kiosk.

== Buildings ==
Name and location	Photograph	Date	Notes
5 and 7 West End; 53.73818°N 0.49251°W		1721	A house, later divided, and at one time a post office, it is in red brick, partly painted, with coved eaves, and a pantile roof with a raised gable on brick kneelers to the right. There are two storeys and five bays. On the front are two doorways, the right with a fanlight containing decorative glazing, the left with a datestone above. There is one fixed window, the other windows are sashes, and all have shutters.
14A, 14, 16, 16A West End; 53.73836°N 0.49238°W		Early 18th century	A row of four cottages, later used for other purposes, in colourwashed brick, with a stepped brick eaves cornice, and a pantile roof with tumbled-in brick to the raised gables. There is one storey and attics, and four bays. On the front are four doorways. There is one casement window, the other windows are horizontally sliding sashes, and on the roof are three swept dormers.
Swanland Hall; 53.73849°N 0.48449°W	—	1760	The house is in painted and rendered brick on a rendered plinth, with string courses, timber dentilled eaves, paired eaves brackets and hipped slate roofs. It consists of a rectangular central range, with projecting rectangular wings, and rear extensions. The main range has three storeys and five bays. On the front is a Greek Doric porch with four columns and an entablature. The doorway has engaged pilasters, an architrave, and a semicircular fanlight. This is flanked by canted bay windows, and on the upper floors are sash windows under slight cambered lintels. The flanking wings have three bays.
Toft House; 53.73987°N 0.48897°W	—	Mid to late 18th century	The house is in dark red brick, and has a pantile roof with raised gables on brick kneelers. There are two storeys and three bays. The central doorway has pilasters, and the windows are sashes in moulded architraves.
Holgate Cottages; 53.73946°N 0.49002°W		Late 18th century	A terrace of five cottages in colourwashed brick with a pantile roof. There are two storeys and five bays. Each cottage has a doorway, and a sash window on each floor, all under segmental brick arches.
Christ Church; 53.73906°N 0.49041°W		1804	Originally a Congregational chapel, porches were added in 1840, and in 1854 Sunday schools were added as flanking single-storey, two-bay gabled wings, with linking screen walls. The building is in grey brick with a hipped Welsh slate roof. The chapel has two storeys and five bays. On the central bay on each floor is a Venetian window, and on the ground floor these are flanked by gabled porches, each containing a doorway with a divided fanlight under a cambered wedge lintel with a projecting keystone. The other windows are round-headed sashes in moulded architraves, with radial glazing. The screen walls contain similar doorways, and on the wings are pointed windows. The gables have decorative bargeboards.
Mere House, Cottages and walls 53.73903°N 0.49144°W		c. 1840–50	A house with flanking projecting cottages, they are in red brick with stone dressings, and slate roofs, ad form a U-shaped plan. The house has a string course, a low coped parapet, and raised coped gables. There are two storeys and three bays. In the centre is a projecting two-storey gabled porch with angle buttresses, containing a doorway with a four-centred arch under a brattished cornice. The ground floor windows are mullioned and transomed, above the porch is a narrow oblong window with a hood mould and a circular panel with a shield, and flanking them are cross windows. The house is joined to the cottages by short screen walls. The cottages have a single storey and attics, and two bays, and contain mullioned and transomed windows with hood moulds. Between the cottages is a brick wall with moulded copings and central octagonal piers.
Swanland House; 53.73755°N 0.49590°W	—	1862	The house is in yellow brick, with sandstone dressings and a Welsh slate roof. There are two storeys, with a front of three bays, returns of four bays, and a lower service wing to the rear right. The central entrance has Ionic columns, an archivolt, a massive carved keystone, and carved spandrels and consoles, under a bow-fronted cornice and a decorative iron balustrade. Above is a sash window with moulded imposts and a segmental archivolt. The outer bays project and are gabled. Each contains a canted bay window with a carved frieze and a cornice on consoles. Above is an iron balustrade and a tripartite window. The gable has moulding in an open pediment, and on the right gable is an iron finial.
K8 telephone kiosk 53.73927°N 0.49054°W		From 1968	The telephone kiosk in Main Street is of the K8 type designed by Bruce Martin. It is in cast iron with an aluminium door, it has a square plan and is painted cream. There is a flat domed roof, under which are rectangular panels with rounded corners containing "TELEPHONE".
