= Swanland =

Village and civil parish in the East Riding of Yorkshire, England

Coordinates: 53.739903°N 0.490498°W

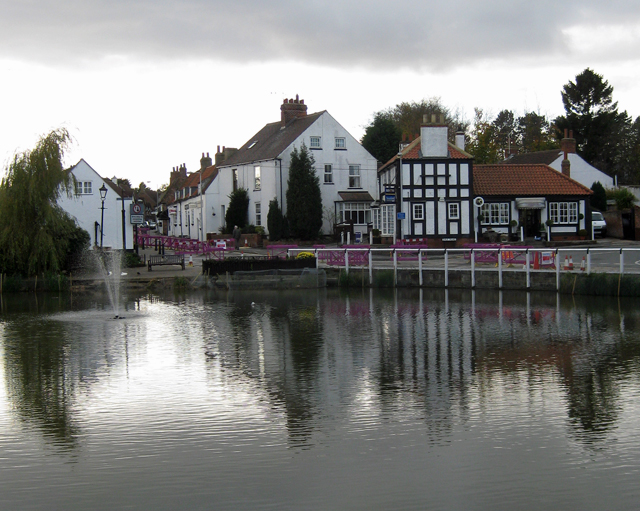
- Swanland Village

- Location within the East Riding of Yorkshire
- Population: 3,802 (2011 census)
- OS grid reference: SE996281
- Civil parish: Swanland
- Unitary authority: East Riding of Yorkshire
- Ceremonial county: East Riding of Yorkshire
- Region: Yorkshire and the Humber
- Country: England
- Sovereign state: United Kingdom
- Post town: NORTH FERRIBY
- Postcode district: HU14
- Dialling code: 01482
- Police: Humberside
- Fire: Humberside
- Ambulance: Yorkshire
- UK Parliament: Goole and Pocklington

Swanland is a village and civil parish in the East Riding of Yorkshire in England. The village is about seven miles (11 km) to the west of Kingston upon Hull city centre and two miles (3.2 km) north of the Humber Estuary in the foothills of the Yorkshire Wolds on the B1231 road.

== Geography ==
The village of Swanland is located approximately 7 miles (11 km) to the west of the centre of Kingston upon Hull on the eastern fringes of the Yorkshire Wolds. The village is distinct from other settlements in the area, separated by fields. To the east are the townships of West Ella, Willerby and Anlaby; to the south-east Hessle and to the south-west North Ferriby.

The civil parish of Swanland is surrounded by the parishes of North Ferriby, Welton, Skidby, Kirk Ella, and Hessle to the south, west, north, north-east and east respectively, with the A63 road forming part of the southern boundary, Melton Bottom road the western boundary, and the A164 approximating to the eastern boundary. The parish is between around 50 and 90 metres (160 and 300 ft) above sea level, with a peak of 92 metres (302 ft) on the western outskirts of the village, close to the location of a water tower.

Swanland offers fine views of the surrounding countryside, particularly across the Humber Estuary, as has been noted historically.

According to the 2011 UK census, Swanland parish had a population of 3,802, an increase on the 2001 UK census figure of 3,688.

Swanland lies within the Parliamentary constituency of Goole and Pocklington.

=== The village ===
Swanland village forms a significant part of the civil parish, and is the only place of note within the parish. Near the centre of the village are a pond, as well as library (East Riding of Yorkshire Council operated), school (Swanland Primary School) and public house. Swanland has a village hall, operating as a registered charity. The B1231 road passes through the village.

There are two churches in the village: St Barnabas is the Church of England Parish Church; and Christ Church, also known as 'The Church by the Pond', is a Methodist / United Reformed Church.

== History ==
There is evidence of human activity and habitation in the area around Swanland dating to the British Iron Age/Roman Britain period.

The name Swanland derives from the Old Norse Svanlundr meaning 'Svan's grove'.

Swanland is not mentioned in the Domesday Survey, though a chapel existed in the medieval period, in the 12th century or earlier, and a Hall, is thought to have been sited at Swanland from at least the 13th century, when it was the residence of Eustace de Vesci. In the later medieval period (16th) the Hall was the residence of the Haldenby family. By the late 18th century the Hall was no longer extant.

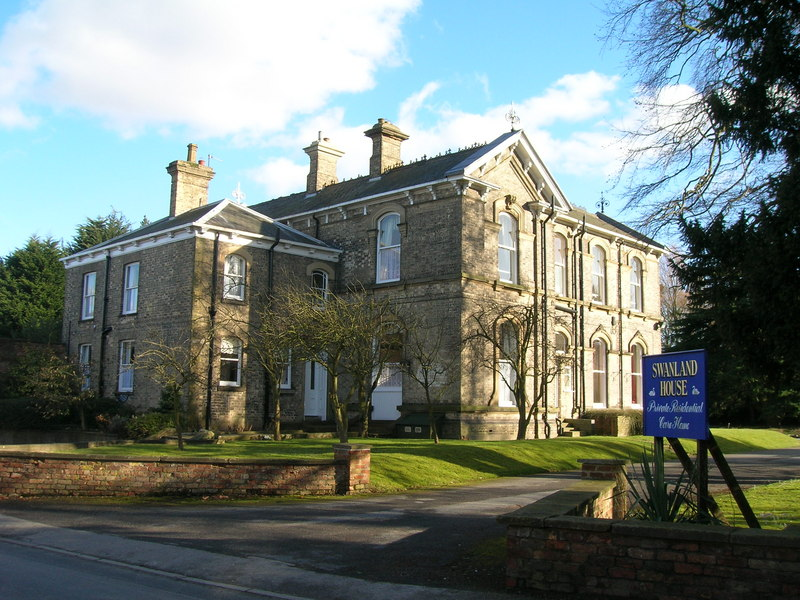
Swanland House (2010)

During the 18th and 19th centuries Swanland, together with other villages west of Hull, became a popular place for wealthy residents of Hull to relocate. Large houses in Swanland included Swanland Hall (built after 1740), Braffords Hall (built after 1778), Swanland House (built 1796, rebuilt c. 1860), and Swanland Manor (built 1848, demolished 1935).

The Congregationalist church, 'Christ Church' was built in 1804, with porches added in the 1840s, and a Primitive Methodist chapel built in 1828. In 1831 Swanland had a population of 418. At the mid 19th century Swanland was essentially a linear settlement along the east–west Mill Lane/Main Street, with the larger halls and manor houses set back from the road in the surrounding land. Outside the village the landscape was rural, enclosed fields, with small scale chalk extraction from pits.

A school was built 1876, next to the pond. The original church of St Barnabas was built in 1899, established as a "mission room" for the parish of All Saints' North Ferriby.

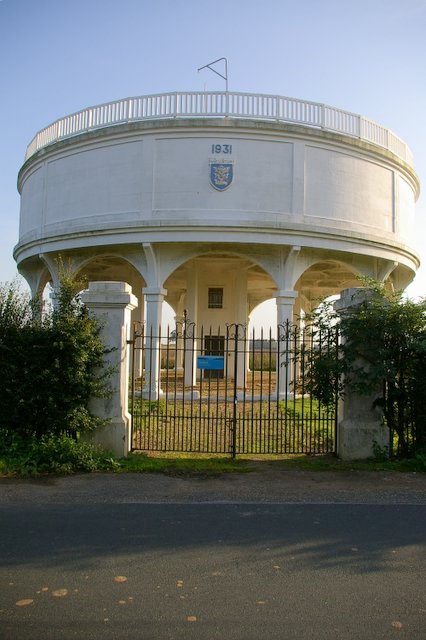
Swanland Water Tower, built 1931

In 1914 an Institute was built, containing a billiards room and library, funded by Sir James Reckitt. During the 1920s and 30s the village expanded again as a commuter village. Electricity was first supplied to the village in 1929 (with street lighting installed 1954). A large 200,000 imperial gallons (910 m^{3}) circular concrete water tower was built in 1931 by Hull Corporation, replacing an earlier tower built in the 1890s.

Outside the village a large chalk pit was dug in the mid 20th century in the southeast corner of the parish (Humberfield Quarry, disused by the 1980s and subsequently filled in).

Initial post war housing development consisted of prefabs. Further house building took place in the 1960s, 70s, 80s, and 90s. The population rose steadily from 1,212 in 1951 to around 4,000 in 1998.

In 1992 a new St Barnabas Church was built to replace the 1899 building. It includes a large integrated hall and conference facilities and was the first new Anglican church constructed in the Diocese of York in more than 50 years.Reuters The project was funded mainly by donations from members of the congregation during the tenures of Rev. Mike Lowe and Rev. Richard Hill. The church is open seven days a week and is used by community groups such as Brownies and the University of the Third Age, as well as for church activities including a parent-and-toddler group, coffee mornings, food-bank collections, and a senior citizens’ exercise class. It also holds regular Sunday services with children’s and youth programmes and various small groups. Swanland became a separate ecclesiastical parish in 1995.

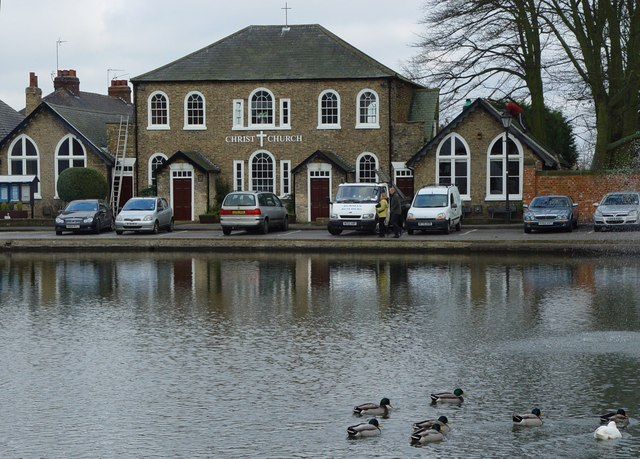
'Christ Church' chapel, 1804 (2008)

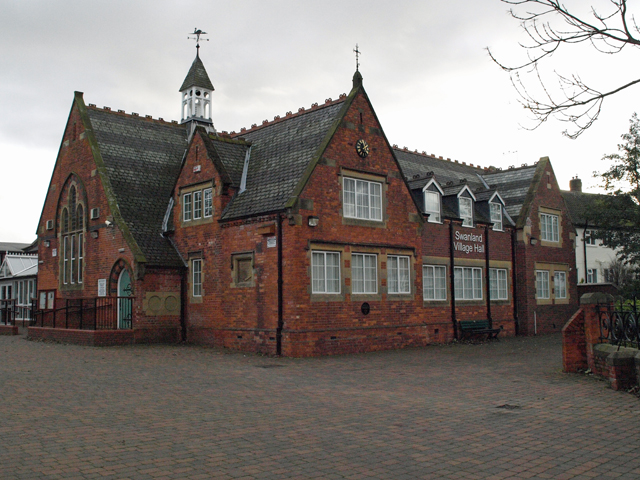
Swanland School, 1876, now village hall (2009)

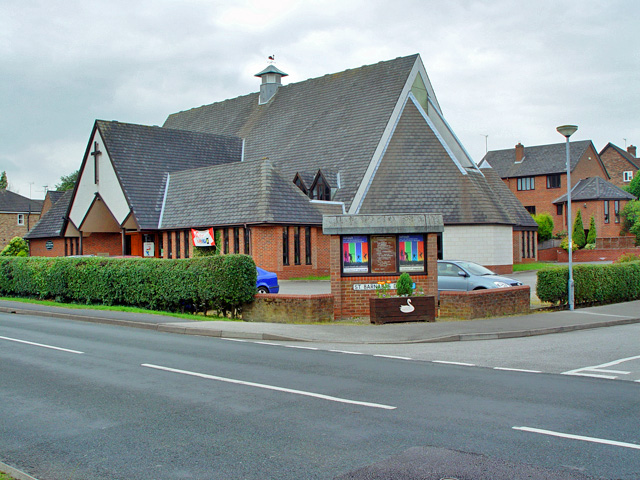
St Barnabas Church, 1992 (2008)

== See also ==
- Listed buildings in Swanland
- Swanland was formerly twinned with the village of Lestrem in Northern France. The twinning arrangement came to an end in the mid-2010s due to a general lack of interest across the village.
