= Kingston upon Hull West and Hessle =

UK Parliament constituency (1997–2024)

- Former borough constituency for the House of Commons
- 2010–2024 boundary of Kingston upon Hull West and Hessle in the former county of Humberside

- Location of the former county of Humberside within England
- County: East Riding of Yorkshire
- Electorate: 59,092 (December 2019)

1997–2024
- Seats: One
- Created from: Kingston upon Hull West, Beverley
- Replaced by: Kingston upon Hull West and Haltemprice

Kingston upon Hull West and Hessle was a borough constituency for the House of Commons of the Parliament of the United Kingdom. It elected one Member of Parliament (MP) at least once every five years by the first-past-the-post electoral system.

The seat was abolished in the 2023 review of Westminster constituencies. With the addition of the villages of Anlaby, Willerby and Kirk Ella, it was replaced by Kingston upon Hull West and Haltemprice, which was first contested in the 2024 general election.

== History ==
The constituency was created in 1997, mostly from the former seat of Kingston upon Hull West as Hessle joined from the former seat of Beverley.

== Boundaries ==
Map of boundaries 1997–2024

This seat contained the wards of Boothferry, Derringham, Myton, Newington, Pickering, and St Andrew's in the City of Kingston upon Hull and Hessle in the District of East Riding of Yorkshire.

== Constituency profile ==
Despite its name, the constituency covered most of Kingston upon Hull's inner city, a deprived area undergoing regeneration. The area had high unemployment and a declining fishing industry. Hessle is a quiet suburb to the west, conservative by nature and having little in common with its larger neighbour apart from mostly working-class roots.

In 2005, The Guardian described the seat as a "City centre and fishing port of isolated, rather grim east coast town."

== Members of Parliament ==
Election	Member	Party
1997	Alan Johnson	Labour
2017	Emma Hardy	Labour
2024	Constituency abolished	

== Election results 1997–2024 ==
=== Elections in the 1990s ===
General election 1997: Kingston upon Hull West and Hessle
Party	Candidate	Votes	%	±%
Labour	Alan Johnson	22,520	58.7	
Liberal Democrats	Bob Tress	6,995	18.2	
Conservative	Cormach Moore	6,933	18.1	
Referendum	Richard Bate	1,596	4.2	
Natural Law	Barry Franklin	310	0.8	
Majority		15,525	40.5	
Turnout		38,354	58.3	
Labour win (new seat)				

=== Elections in the 2000s ===
General election 2001: Kingston upon Hull West and Hessle
Party	Candidate	Votes	%	±%
Labour	Alan Johnson	16,880	58.4	−0.3
Conservative	John Sharp	5,929	20.5	+2.4
Liberal Democrats	Angela Wastling	4,364	15.1	−3.1
UKIP	John Cornforth	878	3.0	New
Independent	David Harris	512	1.8	New
Socialist Labour	David Skinner	353	1.2	New
Majority		10,951	37.9	−2.6
Turnout		28,916	45.8	−12.5
Labour hold		Swing		

General election 2005: Kingston upon Hull West and Hessle
Party	Candidate	Votes	%	±%
Labour	Alan Johnson	15,305	55.0	−3.4
Liberal Democrats	David Nolan	5,855	21.0	+5.9
Conservative	Karen Woods	5,769	20.7	+0.2
Veritas	Stephen Wallis	889	3.2	New
Majority		9,450	34.0	−3.9
Turnout		27,818	45.2	−0.6
Labour hold		Swing	−4.7	

=== Elections in the 2010s ===
General election 2010: Kingston upon Hull West and Hessle
Party	Candidate	Votes	%	±%
Labour	Alan Johnson	13,378	42.5	−12.5
Liberal Democrats	Mike Ross	7,636	24.2	+3.2
Conservative	Gary Shores	6,361	20.2	−0.5
UKIP	Ken Horden	1,688	5.4	New
BNP	Edward Scott	1,416	4.5	New
English Democrat	Peter Mawer	876	2.8	New
TUSC	Keith Gibson	150	0.5	New
Majority		5,742	18.3	−15.7
Turnout		31,505	55.0	+9.8
Registered electors		57,264		
Labour hold		Swing	−7.9	

General election 2015: Kingston upon Hull West and Hessle
Party	Candidate	Votes	%	±%
Labour	Alan Johnson	15,646	49.2	+6.7
UKIP	Paul Salvidge	6,313	19.9	+14.5
Conservative	Jo Barker	5,561	17.5	−2.7
Liberal Democrats	Claire Thomas	3,169	10.0	−14.2
Green	Angela Needham	943	3.0	New
TUSC	Paul Spooner	171	0.5	0.0
Majority		9,333	29.3	+11.0
Turnout		31,803	53.8	−1.2
Registered electors		59,100		
Labour hold		Swing	−3.9	

General election 2017: Kingston upon Hull West and Hessle
Party	Candidate	Votes	%	±%
Labour	Emma Hardy	18,342	53.1	+3.9
Conservative	Christine Mackay	10,317	29.8	+12.3
Liberal Democrats	Claire Thomas	2,210	6.4	−3.6
Independent	Michelle Dewberry	1,898	5.5	New
UKIP	Gary Shores	1,399	4.0	−15.9
Green	Mike Lammiman	332	1.0	−2.0
Libertarian	Will Taylor	67	0.2	New
Majority		8,025	23.3	−6.0
Turnout		34,565	57.4	+3.6
Registered electors		60,181		
Labour hold		Swing	−4.2	

General election 2019: Kingston upon Hull West and Hessle
Party	Candidate	Votes	%	±%
Labour	Emma Hardy	13,384	42.0	−11.1
Conservative	Scott Bell	10,528	33.0	+3.2
Brexit Party	Michelle Dewberry	5,638	17.7	+12.2
Liberal Democrats	David Nolan	1,756	5.5	−0.9
Green	Mike Lammiman	560	1.8	+0.8
Majority		2,856	9.0	−14.3
Turnout		31,866	52.9	−4.5
Registered electors		60,192		
Labour hold		Swing	−7.1	

- Due to a transcription error when declaring the results, the Green Party were initially said to have received 50 votes. However, it later became clear that city council officials had 'lost' 510 Green Party votes. They polled 560 votes.

== See also ==
- Parliamentary constituencies in Humberside
