= St Andrew's Church, Kirk Ella =

Church in Kirk Ella, East Riding of Yorkshire, England

Coordinates: 53°45′14″N 0°27′15″W

The church, in 2005

St Andrew's Church is the parish church of Kirk Ella, a village in the East Riding of Yorkshire, in England.

The church was built in the early 13th century, from which period the chancel survives. The tower was constructed between 1450 and 1454. The church was partly rebuilt in 1860, the work including reconstruction of the nave, south chapel and porch. The tower was restored in 1883, and the choir vestry was added in 1894. The building was grade I listed in 1967. Historic England describes the chancel as "very fine".

The church is built of stone, partly rendered, with an ornamental slate roof. It consists of a nave with a clerestory, north and south aisles, north and south porches, a chancel and a south chapel, and a west tower with a north vestry. The tower has three stages, a high plinth, diagonal buttresses, a pointed west doorway above which is a three-light pointed window with a hood mould, and a canopied niche with a statue, The bell openings have three lights under a four-centred arch. On the south front is a clock face, and above the west bell opening is a buttress flanked by gargoyles, above which is an embattled parapet with eight crocketed pinnacles. Inside, the south arcade is early 14th century, and there is a damaged timber screen from this period at the west end. The 12-sided font dates from 1860. There are a large number of memorials from the late 18th- and early 19th-centuries.

== See also ==
- Grade I listed buildings in the East Riding of Yorkshire
- Listed buildings in Kirk Ella
