= Alan Johnson =

British politician (born 1950)

The Right Honourable Alan Johnson
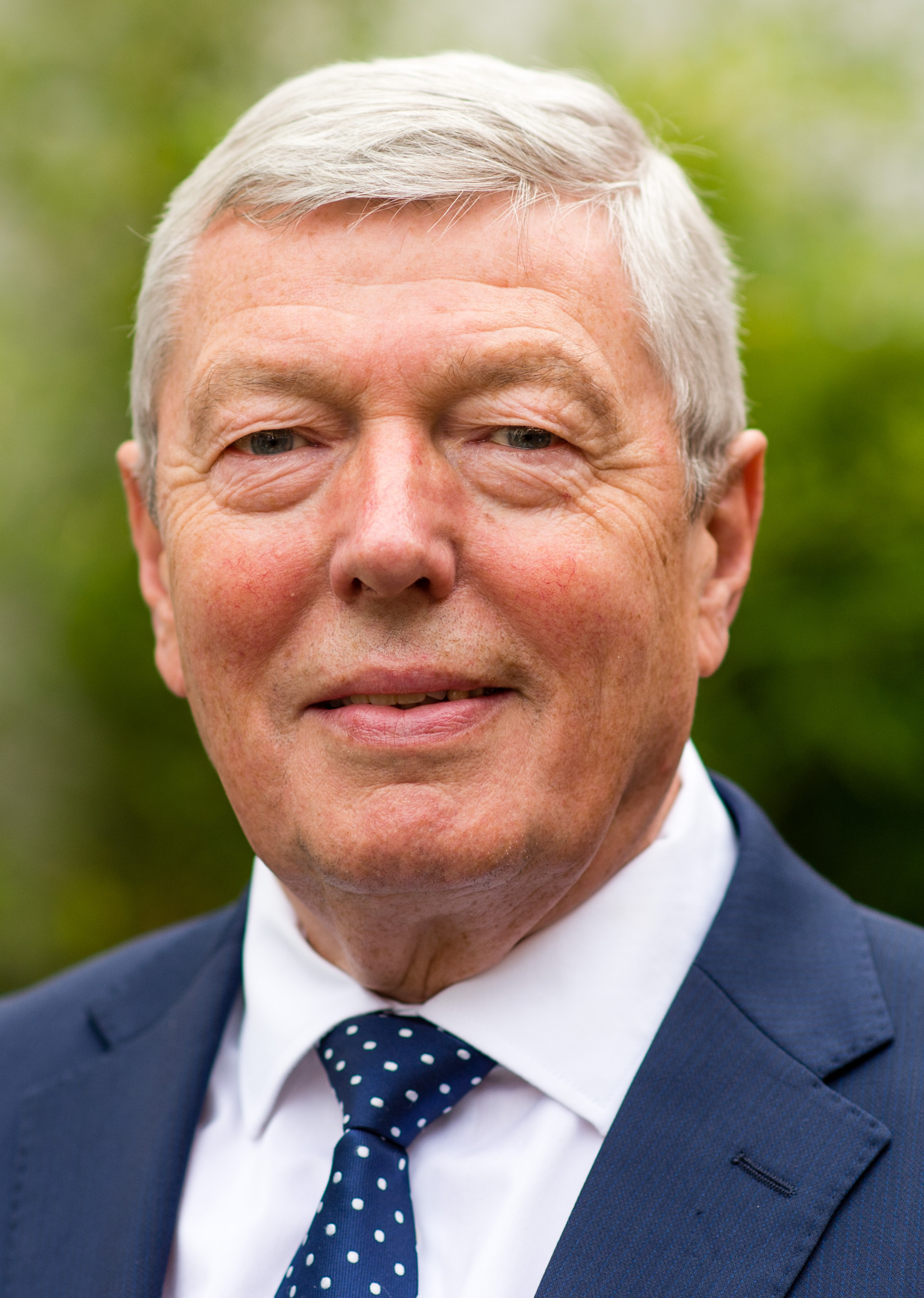
- Official portrait, 2016

Home Secretary
- In office 5 June 2009 – 11 May 2010
- Prime Minister: Gordon Brown
- Preceded by: Jacqui Smith
- Succeeded by: Theresa May

Secretary of State for Health
- In office 28 June 2007 – 5 June 2009
- Prime Minister: Gordon Brown
- Preceded by: Patricia Hewitt
- Succeeded by: Andy Burnham

Secretary of State for Education and Skills
- In office 5 May 2006 – 28 June 2007
- Prime Minister: Tony Blair
- Preceded by: Ruth Kelly
- Succeeded by: Ed Balls (Note: As Secretary of State for Children, Schools and Families)

Secretary of State for Trade and Industry (Note: Productivity, Energy and Industry from 6 May to 13 May 2005) President of the Board of Trade
- In office 6 May 2005 – 5 May 2006
- Prime Minister: Tony Blair
- Preceded by: Patricia Hewitt
- Succeeded by: Alistair Darling

Secretary of State for Work and Pensions
- In office 8 September 2004 – 6 May 2005
- Prime Minister: Tony Blair
- Preceded by: Andrew Smith
- Succeeded by: David Blunkett

Minister for Higher Education
- In office 13 June 2003 – 8 September 2004
- Prime Minister: Tony Blair
- Preceded by: Margaret Hodge
- Succeeded by: Kim Howells
Shadow cabinet positions
Shadow Chancellor of the Exchequer
In office 8 October 2010 – 20 January 2011
Leader	Ed Miliband
Preceded by	Alistair Darling
Succeeded by	Ed Balls
Shadow Home Secretary
In office 11 May 2010 – 8 October 2010
Leader	Harriet Harman (Acting); Ed Miliband
Preceded by	Chris Grayling
Succeeded by	Ed Balls

Chancellor of the University of Hull
- Incumbent
- Assumed office 1 July 2023
- Vice Chancellor: Dave Petley
- Preceded by: Virginia Bottomley

Member of Parliament for Kingston upon Hull West and Hessle
- In office 1 May 1997 – 3 May 2017
- Preceded by: Stuart Randall (Hull West)
- Succeeded by: Emma Hardy

Personal details
- Born: Alan Arthur Johnson; 17 May 1950 (age 76) Paddington, London, England
- Party: Labour
- Spouse(s): Judith Cox; Laura Patient; Carolyn Burgess
- Children: 4
- Website: Official website

Alan Arthur Johnson (born 17 May 1950) is a British former politician who served as Secretary of State for Education and Skills from 2006 to 2007, Secretary of State for Health from 2007 to 2009, Home Secretary from 2009 to 2010, and Shadow Chancellor of the Exchequer from 2010 to 2011. A member of the Labour Party, he was the Member of Parliament (MP) for Kingston upon Hull West and Hessle from 1997 to 2017.

Johnson served in the Cabinet during both the Tony Blair government and that of Gordon Brown. He served under Blair as Minister of State for Universities from 2003 to 2004, as Secretary of State for Work and Pensions from 2004 to 2005, and as President of the Board of Trade from 2005 to 2006.

In May 2023, Johnson was announced as the next Chancellor of the University of Hull. He succeeded Virginia Bottomley in July.

== Early life ==
Alan Arthur Johnson was born on 17 May 1950 in Paddington, London, the son of Stephen and Lillian Johnson. He was orphaned at the age of 13 when his mother died, his father having previously abandoned the family, forcing his sister Linda to become the primary care-giver and breadwinner. Soon after this, they moved to a council flat in Pitt House, Battersea, immediately adjacent to the Winstanley and York Estates, a traumatic change from their previous address in Notting Hill. Johnson describes how he and his sister faced hostility from neighbouring tenants, who were resentful because others (perceived by them as more deserving) were unable to obtain council housing at this time. This meant that their flat was often broken into and targeted for vandalism. Linda, herself aged only 16 at that time, has since been recognised as the hero of Johnson's 2013 memoir This Boy: A Memoir of a Childhood.

Johnson passed the eleven-plus exam and attended Sloane Grammar school in Chelsea, now part of Pimlico Academy, and left school at the age of 15. He then worked at Tesco before becoming a postman at 18. He was interested in music and joined two pop music bands. Johnson joined the Union of Communication Workers, becoming a branch official. He joined the Labour Party in 1971 and has described his views at the time as democratic socialist, having drawn ideological inspiration from studying George Orwell's Nineteen Eighty-Four in school, although he also considered himself a Marxist ideologically aligned with the Communist Party of Great Britain. A full-time union official from 1987, he became General Secretary of the union in 1992.

Before entering parliament Johnson was a member of Labour's National Executive Committee. During this time, he was the only major union leader to support the abolition of Clause IV.

== Parliamentary career ==
Just three weeks before the 1997 general election, Johnson was selected to stand for parliament in the safe Labour seat of Hull West and Hessle when the previous incumbent, Stuart Randall, stood down suddenly. Randall subsequently became a member of the House of Lords.

=== In government ===
He was appointed Parliamentary Private Secretary to Dawn Primarolo in 1997 and achieved his first ministerial post at the Department of Trade and Industry (DTI) in 1999. He was moved to the Department for Education and Skills in 2003 as Minister for Higher Education although he had left school at 15.

Johnson, along with other ministers in Tony Blair's government, and many other MPs, attracted much criticism for voting on 18 March 2003 for the Iraq war: "to use all means necessary to ensure the disarmament of Iraq's weapons of mass destruction" leading to the UK joining the US invasion of Iraq two days later. He responded to such criticism on 21 February 2007 by saying: "The whole cabinet believed the intelligence we were presented [with] and we made our case to the British people based on it in good faith. As we all now know, that intelligence was wholly wrong. We will be judged historically as to whether getting rid of Saddam Hussein, despite all the consequences, was a positive thing or that the consequences outweigh the positives of getting rid of a brutal tyrant."

In September 2004, Prime Minister Tony Blair appointed Johnson to the Cabinet as Secretary of State for Work and Pensions following the resignation of Andrew Smith. Following the 2005 election, Johnson was initially announced on 6 May 2005 as being Secretary of State for Productivity, Energy and Industry; but after just a week, on 13 May, it was declared that the new title would not be used, after widespread derision of the new name, because the abbreviation for Johnson's title, Productivity, Energy and Industry Secretary would have been "PENIS". The department's old name was kept and Johnson served as Secretary of State for Trade and Industry. On 5 May 2006, one day after the 2006 local elections, his brief was changed to that of Secretary of State for Education and Skills, replacing Ruth Kelly.

=== Education Secretary ===
During his time as education secretary, Johnson brought in new ideas and proposals, including encouraging parents to spend more time with their children in a bid to help them progress with their literacy and numeracy skills. Johnson has also previously expressed some concerns over diplomas, and has opened up debate in parliament on the subject of what parental situation is best. He stated that in his view, it is the parents themselves who make the difference, not their marital situation. Johnson looked at improving pay and working conditions for teachers during his tenure as Education Secretary.

=== Health Secretary ===
Johnson became Secretary of State for Health on 28 June 2007, succeeding Patricia Hewitt in Prime Minister Gordon Brown's first Cabinet. He later criticised breast cancer patient Debbie Hirst because she attempted to buy the cancer drug Avastin, which the NHS had denied her. Johnson told Parliament, patients "cannot, in one episode of treatment, be treated on the NHS and then allowed, as part of the same episode and the same treatment, to pay money for more drugs. That way lies the end of the founding principles of the NHS".

When there was a problem with C. difficile at hospitals managed by the Maidstone & Tunbridge Wells NHS Trust, they dismissed their "blameless" chief executive "both unlawfully ... and unfairly" and agreed to pay her £250,000, much less than the sum that they were told that defending a case for unfair dismissal would cost. When the proposed payment became known, Johnson intervened and the Department of Health ordered the trust to withhold more than two-thirds of the severance payment, although its director general of finance, performance and operations said that "it was 'not unfair'" that she should receive the money. When the case came to the Court of Appeal, the payment was restored in a judgement that was highly critical of the Department, including quoting her complaint that Johnson had made "personal comments made about me ... without any reference to the Trust, or informing me, ... regarding my severance value and its non-payment".

=== Home Secretary ===
On 5 June 2009, Johnson was appointed to the position of Home Secretary during a reshuffle, replacing the first female holder of the post, Jacqui Smith.

In October 2009, Johnson sacked the chairman of the Advisory Council on the Misuse of Drugs (ACMD), Professor David Nutt. Nutt had accused the government of "distorting" and "devaluing" research evidence in the debate over illicit drugs, criticising it for making political decisions with regard to drug classifications in rejecting the scientific advice to downgrade MDMA (Ecstasy) from a class A drug, and rejecting the scientific advice not to reclassify cannabis from class C to class B drug. Johnson wrote to the professor: "It is important that the government's messages on drugs are clear and as an advisor you do nothing to undermine public understanding of them. I cannot have public confusion between scientific advice and policy and have therefore lost confidence in your ability to advise me as Chair of the ACMD". In January 2010, Professor Nutt established the Independent Scientific Committee on Drugs, with the aim of publishing honest drug information. By 2 April 2010, seven members of the ACMD had resigned.

In February 2010, it came out in court that MI5 had known that Binyam Mohamed, a former Guantanamo Bay detainee, had been tortured or mistreated by the American services, despite earlier statements to the contrary. In response, Johnson insisted that the media coverage of the torture had been "baseless, groundless accusations". He also said Government lawyers had not forced the judiciary to water down criticism of MI5, despite an earlier, draft ruling by Lord Neuberger, the Master of the Rolls that the Security Service had failed to respect human rights, deliberately misled parliament, and had a "culture of suppression" that undermined government assurances about its conduct.

=== Deputy leadership candidate and potential leader ===
Johnson publicly stated in May 2006 he expected to stand for the post of Leader of the Labour Party when Tony Blair stepped down. Johnson told the BBC in an interview on 9 November 2006 that he would in fact be supporting Brown and standing as deputy leader. He was successfully nominated onto the ballot paper for deputy leader, with the largest number of nominations. On 24 June 2007, Johnson was narrowly beaten for the deputy leadership by Harriet Harman. He led in rounds 2 to 4 of the voting, until he was overtaken by Harman in the last round, eventually finishing with 49.56% of the vote.

Having been touted in the media as a possible successor to outgoing Labour leader Gordon Brown, Johnson announced to the BBC on 12 May 2010 that he would not be standing in the forthcoming leadership contest, and would instead be backing David Miliband.

In November 2014, amid criticism within the party of its leader Ed Miliband, Johnson again denied speculation that he was a potential leadership candidate.

=== Potential London Mayoral candidate ===
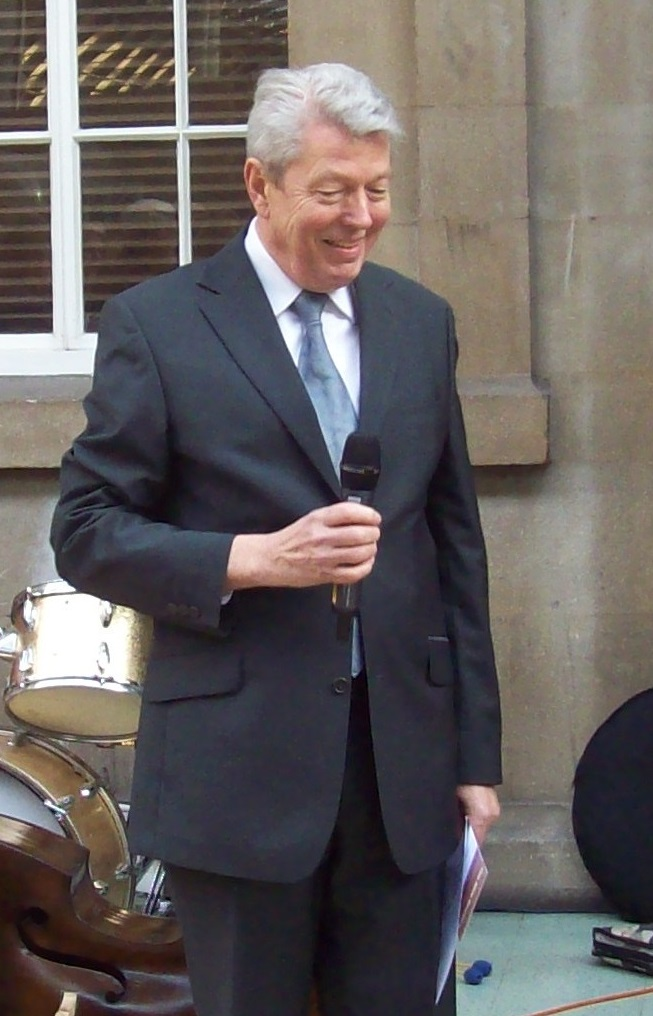
Johnson in Hull, 2011

In 2010, there was much speculation that Johnson was going to stand as a candidate for the London Mayoral election after announcing that he was not going to contest the leadership. Many of Johnson's close allies encouraged him to stand for the Mayoralty and he was thought to have been considering it. However, Johnson decided not to stand for the Labour Party selection for Mayor and instead backed Oona King for the candidacy, but she lost to Ken Livingstone. In 2011, there was speculation that Livingstone could be deselected as the Labour candidate in favour of Johnson but that did not happen. In 2012, following Livingstone's defeat by Boris Johnson, many Labour members said that Johnson should have been the Labour candidate. Johnson then revealed that he did consider standing for Mayor of London but he felt that his allegiance was to Hull. However, he said that he would not stand for Mayor of London in the 2016 elections as he wanted to stay on as an MP.

=== Views on electoral reform ===
Johnson is a strong supporter of electoral reform, advocating the alternative vote plus (AV+) system as recommended by the Jenkins Commission. He indicated that he would seek support within the Labour Party for an amendment to the government's Bill on Electoral Reform, to add AV+ as an additional choice in the referendum. In 2010, it was rumoured that he would step down as an MP to trigger a by-election in Hull, to stand on a proportional representation ticket. He supported the Yes! to Fairer Votes campaign in the referendum on 5 May 2011. He appeared as one of the main Labour supporters of the Yes! campaign at a London event on 3 May 2011, at which Ed Miliband also appeared.

=== Views on trade unionism ===
Writing for the Blairite Progress magazine in 2013, Johnson described trade union officials as "fat, white, finger-jabbing blokes on rostrums shouting and screaming" and said in 2014 that "A perception that Labour is in the pocket of the unions is damaging to the party ... The precious link between Labour and the unions becomes a liability rather than an advantage when it is allowed to look like a transaction."

=== Shadow Chancellor ===
Johnson was chosen as Shadow Chancellor in Ed Miliband's first shadow cabinet, appointed on 8 October 2010. His first major speech was the Opposition response to the comprehensive spending review. The BBC reported that he had made several "gaffes" in his role as Shadow Chancellor and "in an interview he appeared not to know the rate of National Insurance paid by employers, and he was also reported to have clashed with his party leader over the policy of introducing a graduate tax to replace university tuition fees. He resigned as Shadow Chancellor on 20 January 2011 after three and a half months in the job, citing personal reasons. He was replaced by Ed Balls.

=== Since 2015 ===
Johnson campaigned for Britain to remain in the European Union in the 2016 referendum, and was chair of the Labour Party's 'Labour In For Britain' campaign.

A critic of Labour leader Jeremy Corbyn, just before Corbyn was elected leader in 2016 for the second time, Johnson told Rachel Sylvester and Alice Thomson of The Times: "He is totally incompetent and incapable of being the leader of a political party and he knows it. Corbyn was 'useless' in the EU referendum campaign." Concerning moderates like himself: "We've got to recapture this party again otherwise it's dead and finished and gone". Johnson stood down at the 2017 general election. He was succeeded as MP by Emma Hardy.

In January 2020, he appeared as a contestant on reality singing show The Masked Singer dressed as a pharaoh.

In May 2023, he was appointed as Chancellor of the University of Hull and was installed on 1 July.

== Writing ==
=== Memoirs ===
His memoir of childhood, This Boy: A Memoir of a Childhood, was published in 2013. It won the Royal Society of Literature Ondaatje Prize (2014), and the Orwell Prize, Britain's top political writing award.

His second volume of memoirs, Please, Mister Postman (2014), dealt with Johnson's time as a postman and as a union representative. It won the Specsavers National Book Awards "Autobiography of the Year".

His third volume of memoirs, The Long and Winding Road (2016), covered Johnson's time as a politician in the UK Parliament.

His fourth and final volume of memoirs, In My Life: A Music Memoir (2018), covered Johnson's lifelong interest in music.

The titles of all four of his autobiographical books are titles of songs written or performed by The Beatles.

=== Non-fiction ===
Johnson has written a biography of Harold Wilson, as part of a series of biographies on former British Prime Ministers, which was published in September 2024.

=== Novels ===
Johnson has written three novels in the Louise Mangan series, featuring Louise Mangan, a detective in the Metropolitan Police:

- The Late Train to Gipsy Hill (published in 2021) — in which Gary Nelson, an everyman in a London office job, is drawn into the world of an attractive fellow-commuter
- One Of Our Ministers Is Missing (2022) — in which Lord Bellingham, a Foreign Office minister and property tycoon, is reported missing in the White Mountains in Crete
- Death on the Thames (2024)

== Personal life ==
Johnson has been married three times. His first marriage was to Judith Elizabeth Cox, with whom he has one son and two daughters. After their divorce, he married Laura Jane Patient in 1991; the couple had a son, Ollie, born in 2000. The couple divorced in February 2014 after Patient had an affair with Johnson's bodyguard, PC Paul Rice. In December 2015, Johnson married his third wife, businesswoman Carolyn Burgess.

His hobbies include music, tennis, reading, cooking, football and radio. He supports Queens Park Rangers.

== Notes ==
Trade union offices
Preceded by Alan Tuffin	General Secretary of the Union of Communication Workers; 1992–1995	Position abolished
New office	General Secretary of the Communication Workers Union; 1995–1997	Succeeded by Derek Hodgson
Parliament of the United Kingdom
Preceded by Stuart Randall; Hull West	Member of Parliament for Hull West and Hessle; 1997–2017	Succeeded by Emma Hardy
Political offices
Preceded by Andrew Smith	Secretary of State for Work and Pensions; 2004–2005	Succeeded by David Blunkett
Preceded by Patricia Hewitt	Secretary of State for Trade and Industry; 2005–2006	Succeeded by Alistair Darling
Preceded by Ruth Kelly	Secretary of State for Education and Skills; 2006–2007	Succeeded by Ed Balls as Secretary of State for Children, Schools and Families
Preceded by Patricia Hewitt	Secretary of State for Health; 2007–2009	Succeeded by Andy Burnham
Preceded by Jacqui Smith	Home Secretary; 2009–2010	Succeeded by Theresa May
Preceded by Chris Grayling	Shadow Home Secretary; 2010	Succeeded by Ed Balls
Preceded by Alistair Darling	Shadow Chancellor of the Exchequer; 2010–2011	Succeeded by Ed Balls
