= Please, Mister Postman (book) =

Book by Alan Johnson

- First edition
- Author: Alan Johnson
- Language: English
- Genre: Memoir
- Publisher: Bantam Press
- Publication date: 2014

Please, Mister Postman is the second volume of memoirs by Alan Johnson, first published in 2014. The title is a reference to the Beatles' cover of the song of the same name, and to Johnson's past as a postman.

Johnson begins the book at Christmas 1967 when, as a 17-year-old he was an aspiring rock musician, working as a shelf stacker and living in lodgings in Hammersmith. Within the next year he had married, become a father and step-father and started a career at the Post Office.

== Awards and honours ==
- 2014 Specsavers National Book Awards "Autobiography of the Year"
