= Emma Hardy =

British politician (born 1979)

Emma Hardy MP
- Official portrait, 2026

Minister of State for Water and Flooding (Note: Parliamentary Under-Secretary of State until July 2026)
- Incumbent
- Assumed office 9 July 2024
- Prime Minister: Keir Starmer; Andy Burnham
- Preceded by: Robbie Moore
Shadow ministerial offices
Shadow Minister for Environmental Quality and Resilience
In office 5 September 2023 – 5 July 2024
Leader	Keir Starmer
Preceded by	Office established
Shadow Minister for Further Education and Universities
In office 7 January 2020 – 8 March 2021
Leader	Jeremy Corbyn; Keir Starmer
Preceded by	Gordon Marsden
Succeeded by	Matt Western

Member of Parliament for Kingston upon Hull West and Haltemprice Kingston upon Hull West and Hessle (2017–2024)
- Incumbent
- Assumed office 8 June 2017
- Preceded by: Alan Johnson
- Majority: 8,979 (23.5%)

Personal details
- Born: Emma Ann Hardy; 17 July 1979 (age 47) North Newbald, Humberside, England
- Party: Labour
- Education: University of Liverpool; University of Leeds
- Profession: Politician
- Website: Official website

Emma Ann Hardy (born 17 July 1979) is a British Labour Party politician who has served as Minister of State at the Department for Environment, Food and Rural Affairs since 2026. She was previously the Member of Parliament (MP) for Kingston upon Hull West and Hessle until the 2024 general election and is the current Member of Parliament (MP) for Kingston upon Hull West and Haltemprice. Until May 2019, she was also a member of Hessle Town Council focusing on NHS and education. Hardy is a member of Labour's National Policy Forum and was an education union employee.

== Early life and education ==
Emma Hardy was brought up in North Newbald, Humberside, a few miles from the Kingston upon Hull West and Haltemprice constituency she now represents in Parliament. She attended Wyke Sixth Form College to do A-Levels before doing an undergraduate degree in Politics at the University of Liverpool, graduating in 2001. She then completed a PGCE at the University of Leeds in 2004 and taught for more than ten years at Willerby Carr Lane Primary School.

Hardy became politically active in 2011 after joining a campaign protesting against school cuts and meeting Alan Johnson, the then MP for Kingston upon Hull West and Hessle. She left teaching in 2015 to become a full-time organiser for the National Union of Teachers, and served as Deputy General Secretary of the Socialist Educational Association before being elected to Parliament.

== Parliamentary career ==
Hardy was selected as the Labour Party's prospective parliamentary candidate for Kingston upon Hull West and Hessle after the then-MP, Alan Johnson, announced his retirement just weeks before the general election in 2017. She was one of 256 women candidates put forward by the Labour Party at that election, and was elected on 8 June 2017, with a majority of 8,025.

Hardy sat on the House of Commons Education Select Committee from 11 September 2017 to 6 November 2019, and on the House of Commons Treasury Select Committee from 20 April 2021 to 11 March 2024.

From 2017 to 2020, Hardy served as Parliamentary Private Secretary to Keir Starmer in his role as Shadow Secretary of State for Exiting the European Union.

Hardy was Joint Chair of the All Party Parliamentary Group on Endometriosis and worked closely with the women's health charity Endometriosis UK to push for "menstrual wellbeing" to be included as part of the sex and relationship education in schools. On 25 February 2019, the UK government announced that menstrual wellbeing would be included in the curriculum going forward. She continues to work with local charity HEY Endo to enable better recognition of endometriosis in the workplace.

Hardy was also the Vice Chair of the All Party Parliamentary Group on Mesh, and campaigned to suspend the use of vaginal surgical mesh in the NHS. In October 2018, the National Institute for Health and Care Excellence (NICE) declared that vaginal mesh surgery should only be used as a "last resort" to treat pelvic organ prolapse and urinary incontinence.

Hardy campaigned locally in her constituency to secure the funding for the A63 Castle Street development, prevent any further delays and ensure a bridge was built as soon as possible. Following delays to the project, building of the bridge started in October 2018, and it opened to the public in March 2021. Preparation for the A63 road development commenced in October 2020 with the exhumation of 19,000 bodies from the Trinity Burial Ground.

Hardy also lobbied successfully to bring money to Hull for a new Children and Adolescent Mental Health Unit. The money was agreed by the Government in July 2018 and the project was finally completed in January 2020.

In January 2020, Hardy was appointed to Labour's frontbench as a Shadow Education Minister, succeeding Gordon Marsden, who lost his seat in the 2019 general election.

Hardy nominated Keir Starmer in the 2020 Labour Party leadership election and Angela Rayner in the deputy leadership election.

In March 2021 Hardy resigned from her role as a Shadow Education Minister, being succeeded by Matt Western. She cited an increase in constituency work due to the COVID-19 pandemic.

Hardy campaigned for better flood prevention, protections and insurance, presenting a ten minute rule Bill, Flooding (Prevention and Insurance) on 16 November 2021, referencing the 2007 floods which devastated parts of Hull and the East Riding.

In the 2023 British shadow cabinet reshuffle, she returned to the frontbench as Shadow Minister for Flooding, Oceans and Coastal Communities.

In the 2024 United Kingdom general election, she was elected as Member of Parliament for the constituency of Kingston upon Hull West and Haltemprice with a majority of 8,979 on a turnout of 52.1%.

Hardy was appointed to the Starmer ministry as Parliamentary Under-Secretary of State (Minister for Water and Flooding) at the Department for Environment, Food and Rural Affairs on 9 July 2024. In July 2026, she was promoted in the new government as Minister of State by Andy Burnham, with a similar portfolio.

== Personal life ==
Emma Hardy is a Methodist.

Parliament of the United Kingdom
Preceded by Alan Johnson	Member of Parliament for Kingston upon Hull West and Hessle; 2017–2024	Constituency abolished
New constituency	Member of Parliament for Kingston upon Hull West and Haltemprice; 2024–present	Incumbent
