= Robert Levet =

English apothecary (1705–1782)

Robert Levet (1705–1782), a Yorkshireman who became a Parisian waiter, then garnered some training as an apothecary and moved to London, was eulogised by the poet Samuel Johnson, with whom Levet shared a friendship of thirty-six years, in Johnson's poem "On the Death of Dr. Robert Levet."

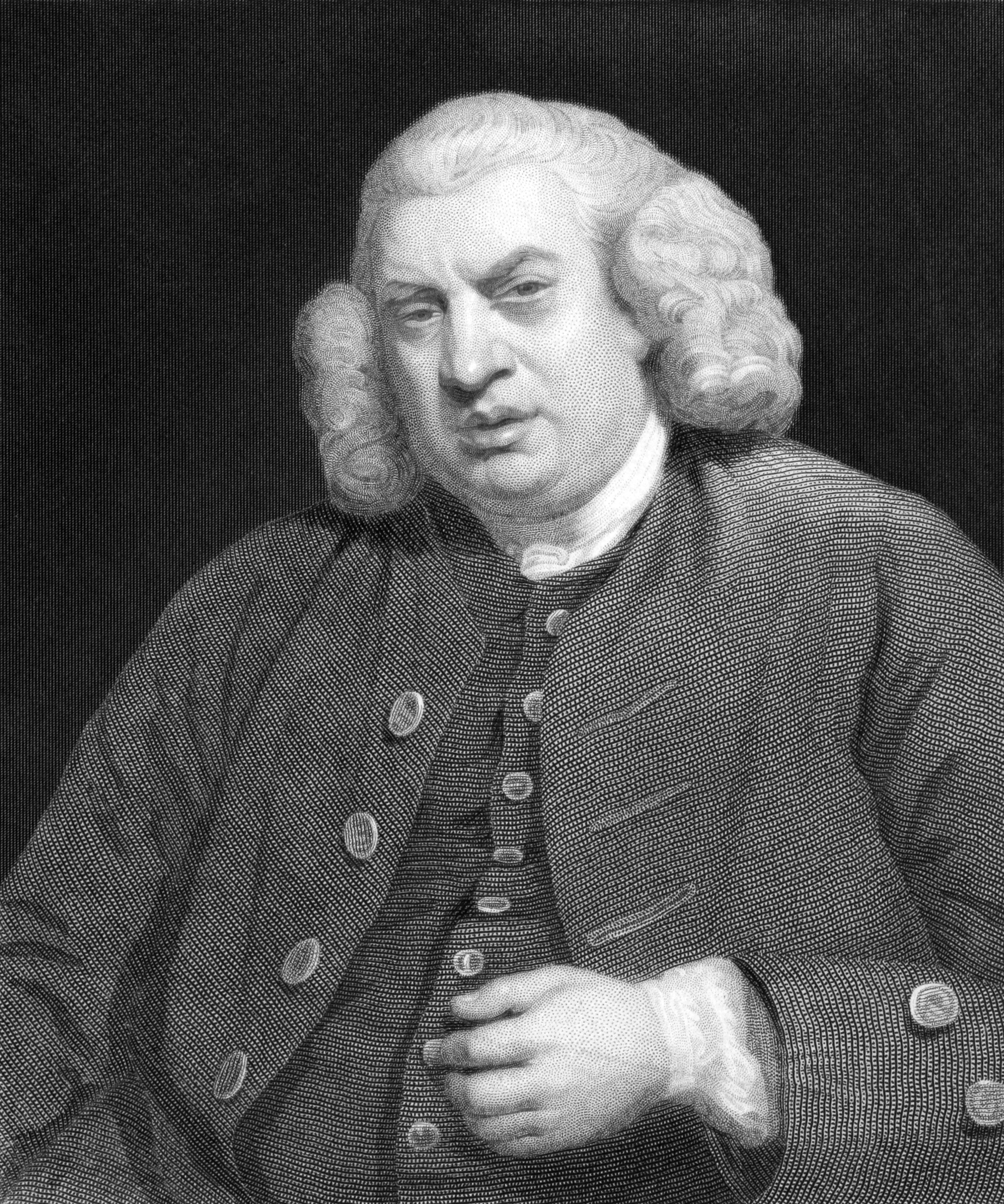
Samuel Johnson, friend to Robert Levet

Levet (sometimes spelled Levett) was described as "an obscure practiser in physick amongst the lower people." Levet was born in Kirk Ella five miles west of Hull, Yorkshire. Levet moved to Paris, where he found work as a waiter. Along the way, he picked up some training as an apothecary.

Levet occupied an apartment within Samuel Johnson's home, where he waited on Johnson "every morning." The two became acquainted in 1746, according to Johnson's biographer James Boswell: "Such was Johnson's predilection for him, and fanciful estimation of his moderate abilities, that I have heard him say he should not be satisfied, though attended by all the College of Physicians, unless he had Mr. Levet with him. Ever since I was acquainted with Dr. Johnson, and many years before, as I have been assured by those who knew him earlier, Mr. Levet had an apartment in his house, or his chambers, and waited upon him every morning, through the whole course of his late and tedious breakfast."

Like most observers, Boswell noted Levet's singularly odd appearance: "He was of a strange grotesque appearance," Boswell wrote, "stiff and formal in his manner, and seldom said a word while any company was present."

Johnson himself spoke of his friend's coarse manners. Levet, he wrote, "is a brutal fellow; but I have a good regard for him, for his brutality is in his manners and not in his mind." Added Boswell: "His character was rendered valuable by repeated proof of honesty, tenderness, and gratitude to his benefactor, as well as an unwearied diligence in his profession." Levet's only real failure, aside from his odd appearance and unpolished manners, was his occasional tendency to overindulge in spirits.

Although some described Levet as a quack, Johnson and his biographer observed that while working as a waiter in a Parisian coffeehouse, the young Yorkshireman's habit of eavesdropping on conversations of physicians had been noted, and some had taken a collection to get Levet some training. That training consisted mostly of apothecary study, as well as the occasional attendance at medical lectures. Nevertheless, Levet apparently conducted an extensive medical practice among the denizens of London's seedier neighbourhoods, where besides taking in modest fees, Levet was embraced by what contemporaneous writers sometimes referred to as "the lower classes." Perhaps that was because Levet was one of them.

Whatever relationship grew between Levet and Johnson, it lasted many years. The two often supped together, and despite their different backgrounds seemed to enjoy each other's company. When Johnson travelled abroad, he was in the habit of writing his lodger Levet. Johnson knew little of Levet's background, but he seemed to cherish the awkward, unpolished man nonetheless.

One can get some sense of Johnson's genuine feeling for his boarder—whom the renowned poet and author had taken in after Levet made a bad marriage in which he was hoodwinked—in the encomium that Johnson wrote eulogising his old friend. Levet's death of a heart attack in 1782 came when Johnson himself was 72 years old. The London Chronicle of 24 January 1782, carried this item: "Last week died at the house of his friend, Dr. Samuel Johnson, Dr. Levet, a practitioner in physic." After Levet died, Johnson posted notice of his death in the London newspapers, hoping to find the Yorkshire heirs to the meager estate Levet left behind. Johnson ultimately located Levet's two brothers in Yorkshire's East Riding.

In Johnson's tribute to the departed Levet, one can sense what might have drawn the learned man of letters to the rough unlettered apothecary from Hull:

"When fainting nature call'd for aid,

And hov'ring death prepar'd the blow,
His vig'rous remedy display'd

The power of art without the show."

After Johnson's death, curiosity about his lodger was gratified by an article in the Gentleman's Magazine (Feb. 1785), "A Few Particulars Concerning Mr. Levet." It was based mostly on the testimony of Johnson himself, and appears to be the work of the literary editor and scholar, George Steevens.
