= Ella, Pennsylvania =

Unincorporated community in Pennsylvania, U.S.

Coordinates: 41°18′36″N 79°11′26″W

Ella is an unincorporated community in Jefferson County, in the U.S. state of Pennsylvania.

== History ==
A post office was established at Ella in 1886, and remained in operation until 1907. Ella M. Painter served as an early postmaster.
