= Lake Ella =

Lake in Florida, United States

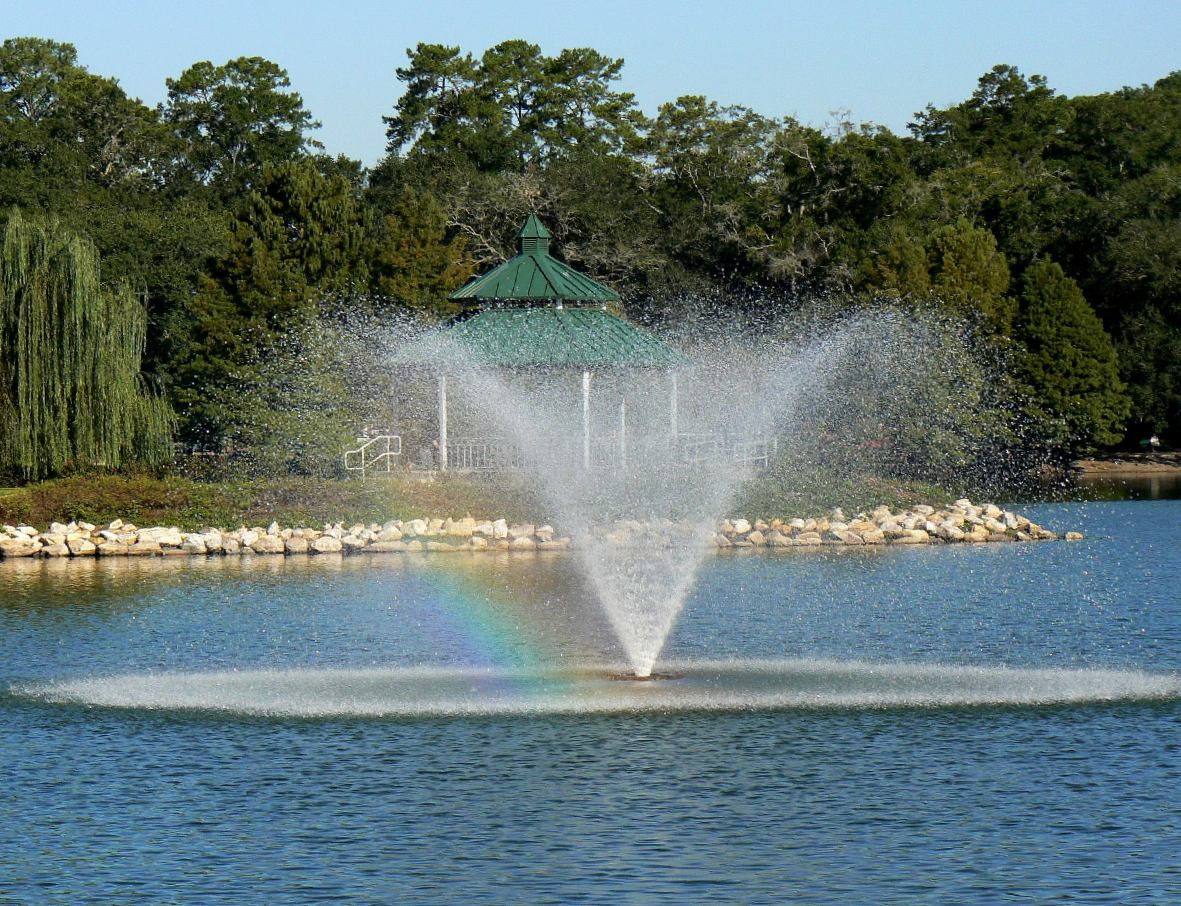
- One of the fountains (September 2006)

- Location within Florida Location within the United States
- Location: Tallahassee, Florida
- Coordinates: 30°27′40″N 084°16′46″W
- Basin countries: United States
- Surface area: 12 acres (4.9 ha)

Lake Ella, Tallahassee, Florida.

Lake Ella is a lake in central Tallahassee, Florida on US 27 just south of Tharpe Street, and just north of Downtown. Lake Ella has an area of 12 acres (49,000 m^{2}) and a perimeter 0.6 miles. Once used for cattle, it now has three fountains and is used for recreation, flood protection, and stormwater pollution control.

== History ==
Lake Ella was originally called Bull Pond (sometimes spelled Buhl). Records for this name date back as far as 1867 when some local black churches held baptisms in its clear waters. In 1867 some 2000 "freedmen" gathered there for a day-long political rally.

In the early 20th century Lake Ella became part of the "Old Spanish Trail", a coast-to-coast highway extending from San Diego to St. Augustine, Fl. This was one of a network of named roads, so named to promote tourism.

On the west bank of the lake are several cottages that were once part of the Tallahassee Motor Hotel, a hotel opened by Gilbert S. Chandler in 1925 to cater to this tourist trade. Around the same time the lake was renamed Lake Ella.

The cottages were once used as lakefront honeymoon rooms but are now occupied by local businesses. On the north shore of the lake is American Legion Post 13.

== Recreation ==
Lake Ella is incorporated into the 6.5 acre (26,000 m^{2}) Fred Drake Park. The park has picnic shelters, a site for community activities such as amateur astronomy and exercising, and a paved walking trail that completely encircles the lake. Visitors can walk, skate, or skateboard the 0.6 mi around the lake. Visitors also enjoy feeding the many ducks, geese, pigeons, and turtles that live at the lake.

On Jan 24, 2009, Lake Ella hosted a group of Tibetan monks on their visit to Tallahassee. They spent a week creating a sand mandala at The Mary Brogan Museum of Art and Science. The monks then destroyed the mandala in a "special dissolution ritual" and brought the sand to Lake Ella "so that its healing energies would be dispersed throughout the world." On December 13, 2010, the monks arrived in Tallahassee for another visit, and dismantled the new mandala on December 19.

Lake Ella is host to many local events, including regular food truck events, concerts, holiday celebrations, and seasonal markets.

== Stormwater control ==
In 1986, Lake Ella underwent extensive rehabilitation including sediment removal, reshaping of the shoreline, reducing the number of stormwater inflow pipes, and installation of an automatic alum treatment system. Lake Ella receives stormwater runoff from an urban watershed that is approximately 157 acres (635,000 m^{2}) in area. During a typical year the lake treats somewhere around 250 million gallons (946,352 cu. m) of stormwater runoff. During normal water elevations the lake stores approximately 27 million gallons (102,206 cu. m) of water. During excessive rain events the lake can store an additional 9 million gallons (34,068 cu. m). Pollutant treatment is obtained through an automated system that doses alum at six locations based on the volume of stormwater entering the lake. Alum, which is a substance used by some communities to treat drinking water, mixes with incoming stormwater and causes pollutants to settle to the lake bottom.

Lake Ella sometimes floods after severe storms, which can cause the surrounding roads to be closed for a few days.
