= USS Ella =

USS Ella has been the name of more than one United States Navy ship, and may refer to:

- USS Ella (1859), a steamer in commission from 1862 to 1865
- USS Ella (SP-1676), a patrol boat briefly under U.S. Navy control during 1917.

== See also ==
- USS Philippi (1863), a steamer commissioned in April 1864 and destroyed in August 1864, was formerly the Confederate States of America blockade runner Ella.
