= West Ella =

Village in the East Riding of Yorkshire, England

Coordinates: 53.749728°N 0.471340°W

- Village
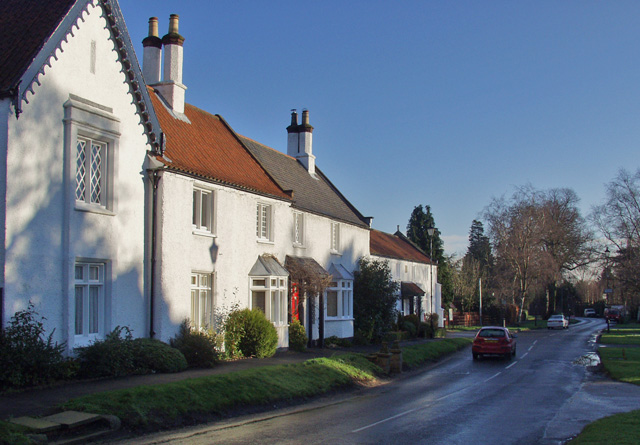
- West Ella Road, West Ella (2008)

- Location within the East Riding of Yorkshire
- OS grid reference: TA009292
  - London: 155 mi (249 km) S
- Civil parish: Kirk Ella
- Unitary authority: East Riding of Yorkshire
- Ceremonial county: East Riding of Yorkshire
- Region: Yorkshire and the Humber
- Country: England
- Sovereign state: United Kingdom
- Post town: HULL
- Postcode district: HU10
- Dialling code: 01482
- Police: Humberside
- Fire: Humberside
- Ambulance: Yorkshire
- UK Parliament: Kingston upon Hull West and Haltemprice

West Ella is a village in the civil parish of Kirk Ella, in the East Riding of Yorkshire, England, on the eastern edge of the Yorkshire Wolds. It is 6 miles (10 km) west of the city of Hull.

The village lies on West Ella Road, between Kirk Ella and Swanland – it was beautified by the owners the Sykes family in the 19th century, and as a consequence much of the area is now a conservation area, with many listed buildings. In the two decades after the end of the Second World War the village expanded, more than doubling the housing stock, mainly high quality detached dwellings, with much of the new housing along an additional road, Elveley Drive, running north.

West Ella is considered to be one of the most exclusive and desirable villages to live in the East Riding of Yorkshire.

== Geography ==
The small village of West Ella is around 0.6 miles (1 km) roughly west of the traditional village centre of Kirk Ella; much of the village's housing is located on the east-west West Ella Road from Kirk Ella to Swanland, there is also housing north towards Riplingham Road along Elveley Drive. The village lies in the eastern foothills of the Yorkshire Wolds and is at between 40 and 60 metres (130 and 200 ft) above sea level, rising westward. Most of the village along West Ella Road is a conservation area, due to the picturesque nature of the village; the area is richly treed, and hedged with associated wildlife.

The village is separated from its neighbours on all side by open land, coppices and the golf course of Hull Golf Club. Directly west of the village is the route of the modern A164.

Together with the adjacent village of Kirk Ella, West Ella forms the civil parish of Kirk Ella; and is within the Parliamentary constituency of Kingston upon Hull West and Haltemprice.

West Ella, with Cottingham, Willerby, Kirk Ella, Anlaby, and Anlaby Common and the town of Hessle was once part of a district of Haltemprice.

== History ==
The name has been interpreted to mean "Aelf(a)'s Western Woodland Clearing", and be Old English in origin; there is evidence of human activity in the area from the Mesolithic period, and later during the Iron Age and Roman Britain periods. Of four references to "Ella" in the Domesday Book it is thought that one refers to West Ella, either as a village of 20 or 5 persons.

Writers in the 19th century speculated that the names of nearby features, Kerry Pits (south-east of the village) and The Lunds (north-east, now a golf course) were etymological evidence of druidic activities in the area; "Kerry" being postulated to derive from "cyric" (place of worship); "lund" meaning grove, a reference to a (druidic) grove.

The fields around Kirk Ella, West Ella and Willerby were enclosed in by acts of 1796 and 1824.

Unlike its eastern neighbour Kirk Ella no movement of Hull merchants to, or pattern of construction of large houses took place in West Ella during the 18th and 19th century – in 1801 the villages population of 79; in 1851 the population was 1851. The only large house in the village was, and is West Ella Hall, built c. 1740; the house became the property of Joseph Sykes (see Sykes family of Sledmere) in 1756 who improved the place, enclosing the grounds. The original two storey four bay house was extended on each side in the 1770s, with further extensions in 1800, early 1800s and 1884.

The village of West Ella was 'Gothicised' by its owners the Sykes family in the 19th century – with houses receiving both Tudor and Gothic details – the majority or buildings date from the early or mid 19th century; the remainder from the mid or late 18th century; the Ancient Manor House, has a datestone of 1753. As a result of the beautification many of the 19th century village buildings are now listed buildings and/or listed on the National Record of the Historic Environment as of heritage interest. One, Jasmine Cottage, was altered with the loss of much of the original Gothicisation in the 1970s.

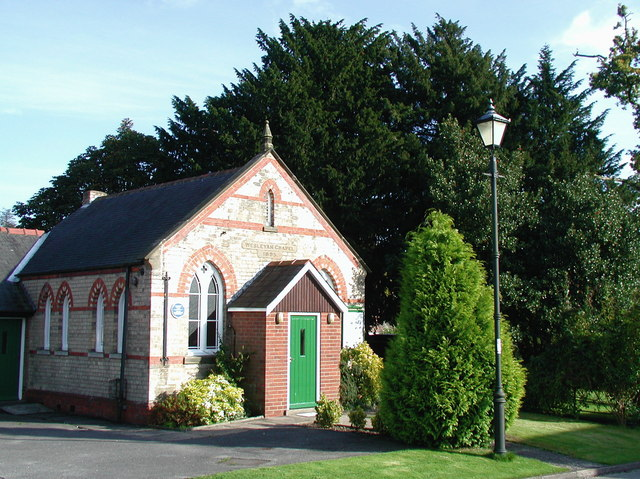
1895 Methodist chapel (2008)

In 1850 the village consisted of a single street, with West Ella Hall and its large grounds at the east end on the south side; the Manor House off a short track to the south; and less than twenty other buildings. A Wesleyan Methodist church was built 1895, in other respects development of the village was unchanged at the beginning of the 20th century. During the first half of the 20th century there was little building growth in the village. By the end of the 1930s the urban spread of Kirk Ella had begun to expand westwards along West Ella Road. By the end of the 1940s this growth had reached West Ella, with substantial garden houses all along the south side of West Ella Road between the two villages; new housing had been developed in West Ella at the west and east ends, also of a substantial nature of detached houses with large gardens.

By the 1960s a new road and housing estate had been built north of the original village : Elveley Drive and The Fairway, in the area of plantation known as Long Drive Wood; by the beginning of the 1970s this had been extended connecting northwards to Riplingham Road. This extent of development remained mostly unchanged to the present (2006).

West Ella was formerly a township in the parish of Kirk-Ella, in 1866 West Ella became a separate civil parish, on 1 April 1935 the parish was abolished and merged with Haltemprice. In 1931 the parish had a population of 122.

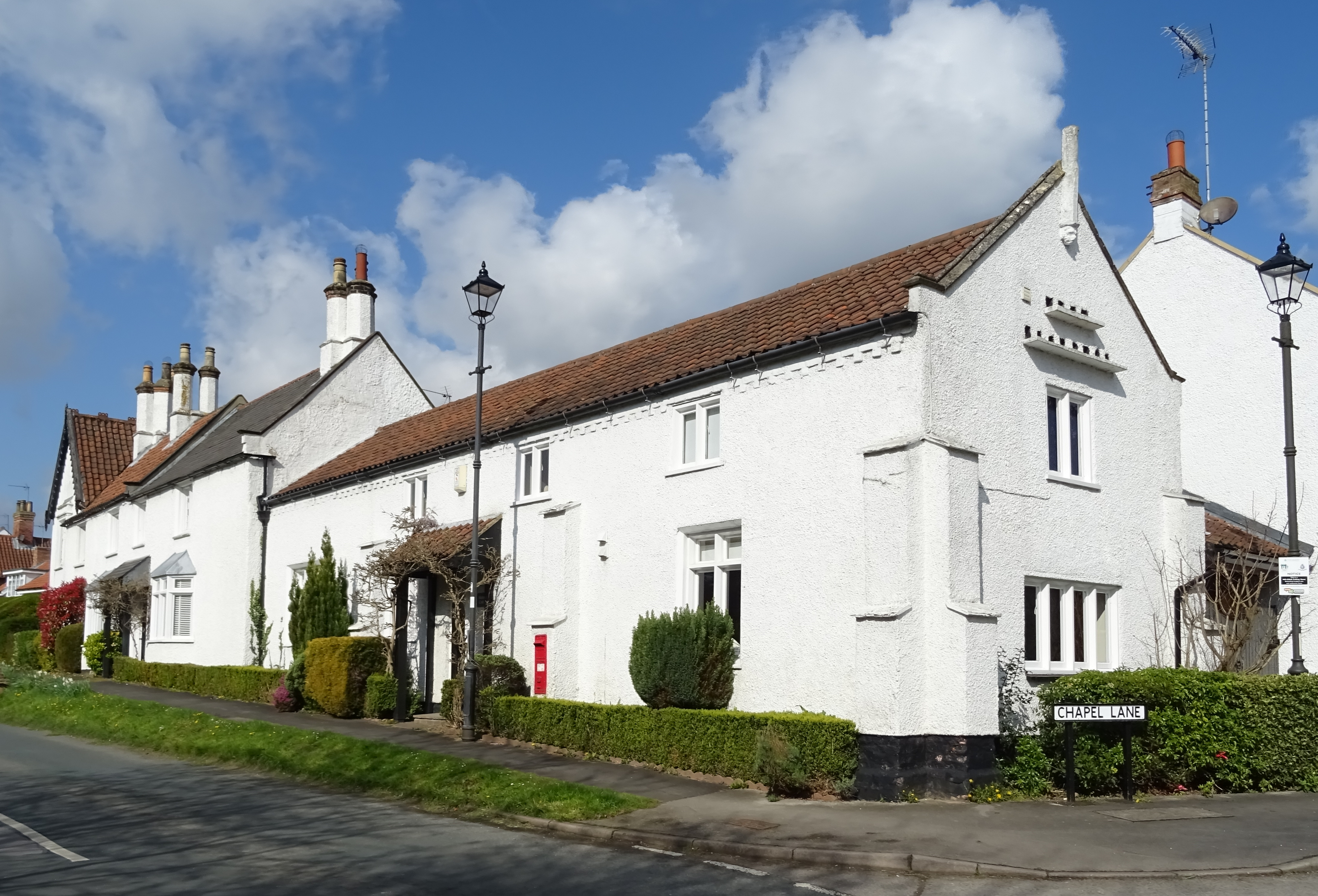
Gothicised housing on West Ella Road

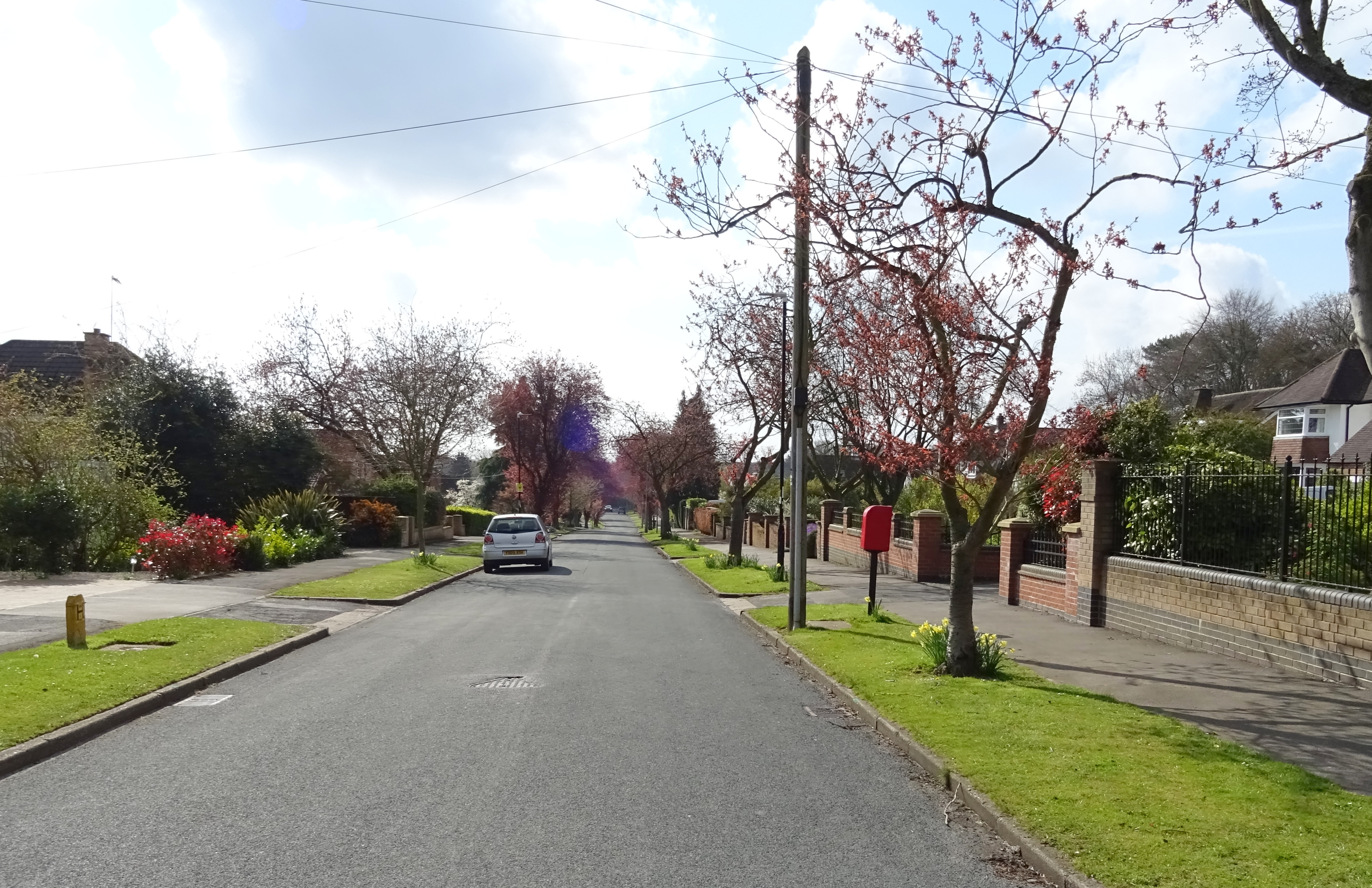
Elveley Drive

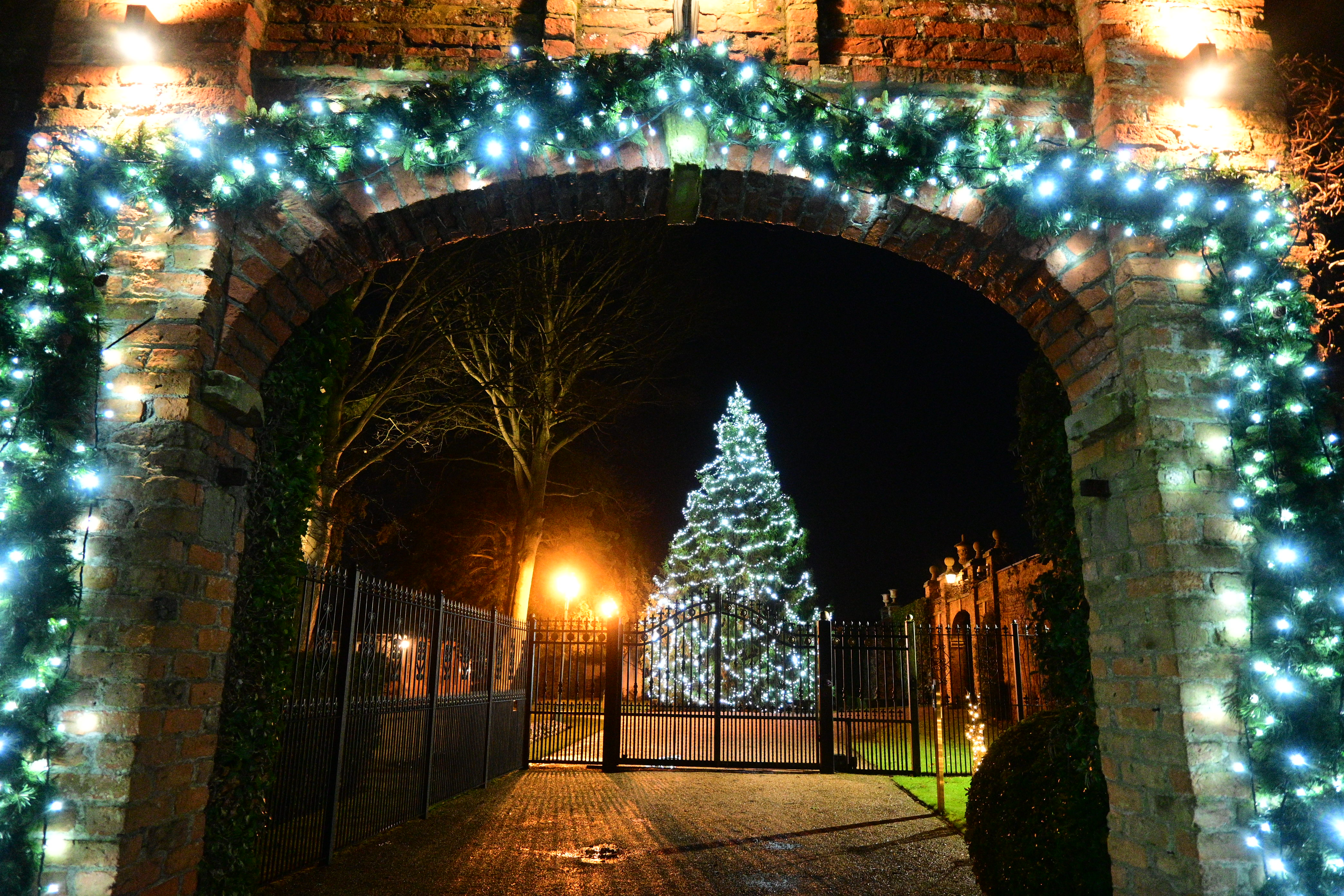
Christmas Archway, West Ella Road

== Notable people ==
- Eddie Healey, billionaire businessman, lived at West Ella Hall.
