= East Ella =

Suburb of Hull, East Riding of Yorkshire, England

Coordinates: 53.747°N 0.400°W

East Ella is a small suburb to the west of the northern England city of Kingston upon Hull. East Ella was an area of common land to the east of the nearby village of Anlaby and the west of Hull and was in the County Borough of Kingston upon Hull.

== History ==
Like Anlaby Common, East Ella was once common land near the start of the large city of Hull. By the 1890s the Hull, Barnsley and West Riding Junction Railway had been constructed, east–west, across the land, and construction of terraced and court housing had taken place north-west of Spring Villa (Ditmas Avenue etc.), on the north side of Anlaby Road. The railway built a locomotive works (Springhead locomotive works), and sidings in the north-eastern part of the common.

By 1910 the locomotive works and sidings had been considerably expanded, and by the mid 1920s the housing estate of Anlaby Park had been built (begun 1911) as a private development on the grounds of Spring Villa, as well as the Almhouses Lee's Rest Houses; to the east, the former East Ella house had been redeveloped as part of the White City Pleasure Grounds, with additional buildings including dance and concert halls.

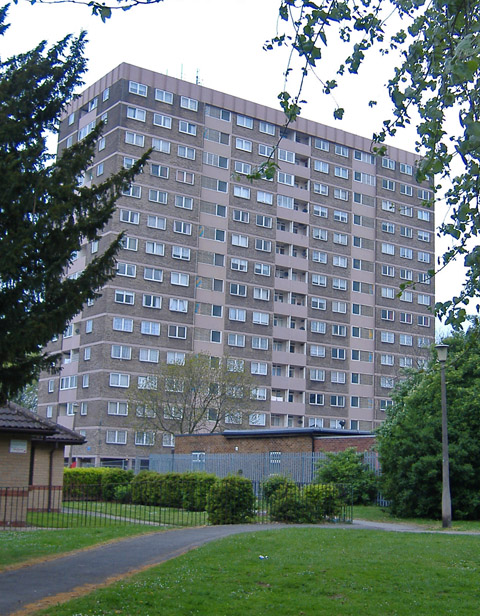
Lindsey Place, East Ella, built c. 1964

A large fire destroyed the White City stadium in 1938. Remaining parts of the pleasure ground were demolished in 1945, and East Ella house in around 1951. Temporary housing was constructed on the grounds in the post Second World War period (Arcon Drive, demolished and redeveloped 1977).

== Geography ==
The area is also home to many apartment blocks including Lindsey Place. The old Eastfield School has been demolished and has made way for the high-tech Eastfield school on the same plot of land.

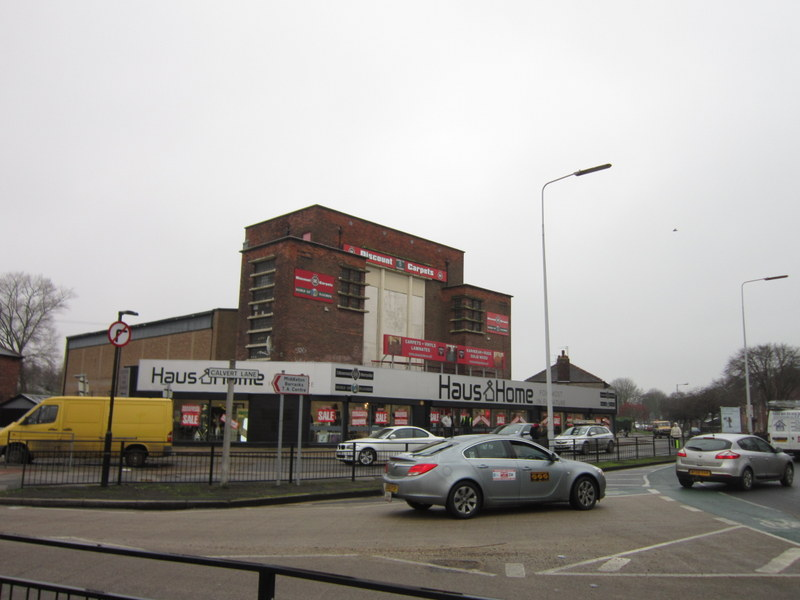
The former Priory cinema, East Ella, 2013 (now a Heron Foods supermarket)

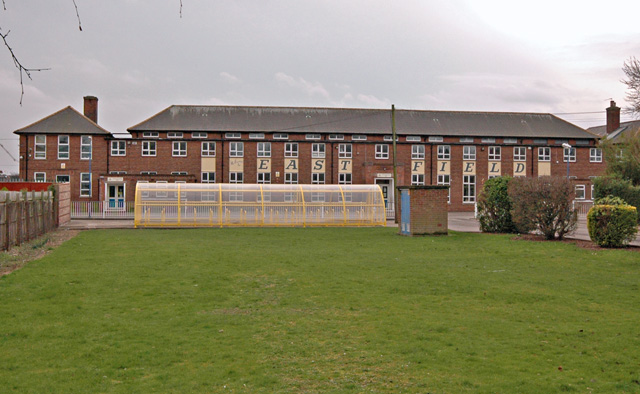
Eastfield school, est. 1930, expanded 1936, demolished 2016
