= Kirk Ella =

Village in the East Riding of Yorkshire, England

Coordinates: 53°45′03″N 0°27′13″W

- Village and civil parish
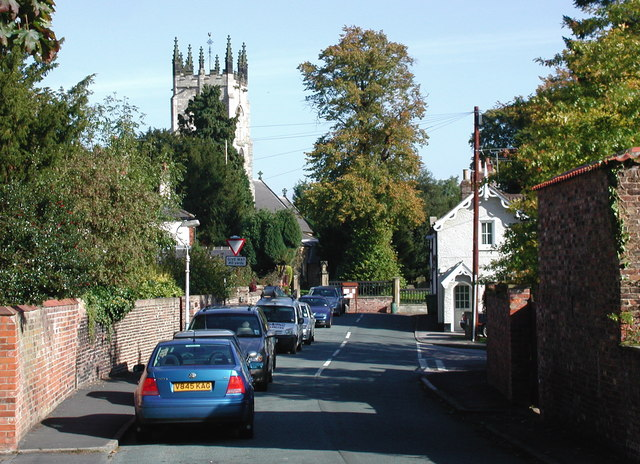
- Godmans Lane, Kirk Ella

- Location within the East Riding of Yorkshire
- Population: 5,638 (2011 census)
- OS grid reference: TA018294
  - London: 155 mi (249 km) S
- Civil parish: Kirk Ella
- Unitary authority: East Riding of Yorkshire
- Ceremonial county: East Riding of Yorkshire
- Region: Yorkshire and the Humber
- Country: England
- Sovereign state: United Kingdom
- Post town: HULL
- Postcode district: HU10
- Dialling code: 01482
- Police: Humberside
- Fire: Humberside
- Ambulance: Yorkshire
- UK Parliament: Kingston upon Hull West and Haltemprice

Kirk Ella is a village and civil parish in the East Riding of Yorkshire, England. The parish includes the village of West Ella. The village is situated 5 miles (8.0 km) west of Hull.

Kirk Ella has been a village since at least the 11th century: it remained a relatively unimportant hamlet until the 18th and 19th centuries, when it became a location of choice for merchants of Hull wishing to live outside the city. Several large houses were built during this period, without any substantial increase in village population. After the 1920s, the village grew substantially, with large amounts of high quality housing surrounding the traditional village centre. The village continued to grow during the second half of the 20th century, becoming a large suburb, contiguous with Anlaby and Willerby.

The civil parish is called "Kirk Ella and West Ella".

== Geography ==
Kirk Ella is primarily residential, but has a few shops. Modern Kirk Ella is contiguous with the suburbs of Willerby to the north; and Anlaby to the east; the village of West Ella is to the west, separated by a golf course; to the south is Hessle separated by under one kilometre (5/8 mile) of fields.

The village skirts the foothills of the Yorkshire Wolds to the west, and rises from around 10 to 40 metres (35–130 ft) above sea level east to west. Housing stock is affluent, much of it detached or semi detached, with large back gardens; street layouts are irregular, curved, with no main roads passing through the village. Much of the housing development is to the south-east of the original village centre, and church. An area of Kirk Ella including the church, Church Lane, and parts of Packman Lane and Godmans Lane has been designated a conservation area (since 1974), mainly due to its interesting and varied housing stock. The large gardens in much of the village contribute to a wide variety of native and non-native trees and bushes, and thriving wildlife.

Kirk Ella lies within the Parliamentary constituency of Kingston upon Hull West and Haltemprice.

The farm known as Kirk Ella Grange is to the north-west, far outside the village, halfway between Raywell and West Ella.

The civil parish is located at the north-western edge of the suburbs of Kingston upon Hull, within the East Riding of Yorkshire. The parish is bounded by the former route of the Hull and Barnsley Railway to the north-east, including an embanked section, and part of the route converted to the B1232 road; by the A164 road to the west and north-west; and by the B1231 to the south.

The parish covers an area of 523.715 hectares (1,294 1/8 acres), and is situated at heights of between 10 and 60 m (35 and 195 ft) above sea level, rising east to west.

Kirk Ella forms much of the eastern part of the parish, and its urban spread is contiguous with Willerby and Anlaby outside the parish to the north-east and east. The western part of the parish includes the small village of West Ella, and undeveloped land, including a golf course, and woods. The civil parishes of Anlaby with Anlaby Common, Swanland, Skidby and Willerby are to the south, west, north-west, and north-east respectively.

According to the 2011 UK census, the parish had a population of 5,638, a decrease on the 2001 UK census figure of 5,661.

== History ==
=== Early history ===
Known archaically as Aluengi (Domesday Book), or Kirk-Elveley.

The name "Kirk Ella" is thought to derive from the Old English, and mean "Aelf(a)'s Woodland Clearing with a Church".

Kirk Ella appears in the 11th century Domesday survey as Aluengi (Ella). There is some evidence for human activity in the area as far back as the Bronze Age – bronze axes have been discovered in the area, pottery from the Roman period has also been found, and an Iron Age enclosure visible as cropmarks has been found halfway between the village and Swanland.

After the Norman Conquest the village was the property of Ralph de Mortimer, as part of the manor of Ferriby. Ownership passed to the Wake family during the reign of Edward II. Part of the land was given by Thomas Wake (1297–1349) to Haltemprice Priory.

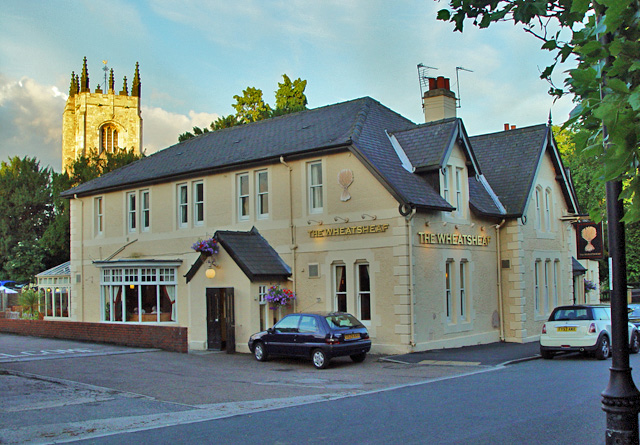
The Wheatsheaf pub with St Andrew's Church in the background (2008)

St Andrew's Church, Kirk Ella, now a Grade I listed building, dates to the early 13th century (chancel), with a tower dating to the mid 15th century. Much of the structure is of square rubble; the tower is of limestone ashlar; the upper part of the chancel is of rendered brick. The building was restored and remodelled 1859–60, widening the aisles, and a north chapel, south porch and organ chamber added; the tower was restored 1882–83. Other alterations took place in 1886–87 to the chancel north wall and arch; 1890, clerestory windows; 1894 choir vestry, enlarged 1955–56. The church contains numerous monuments and inscriptions, many of late 18th and 19th century, many to members of the Sykes family, most notable of which is one to Joseph Sykes (d.1805) by John Bacon junior, similar to a tomb by Louis-François Roubiliac for William Hargrave in Westminster Abbey. In the graveyard are the stones of a Norman arch, and several 19th century table tombs, including a chest tomb of Jane Whitaker, (d.1815, aged 9 months), now a listed structure.

Kirk Ella was once one of the parishes of the county of Hull (Hullshire), established in 1440, and incorporated West Ella, Willerby, Wolfreton and Anlaby, and included a detached within modern day Hull roughly halfway between Hull and Hessle town centres.

By the 17th century lands in Kirk Ella had become the property of several persons including Ralph Ellerker of Risby; George Whitmore; and John Anlaby of Etton.

=== 1750–1900 ===
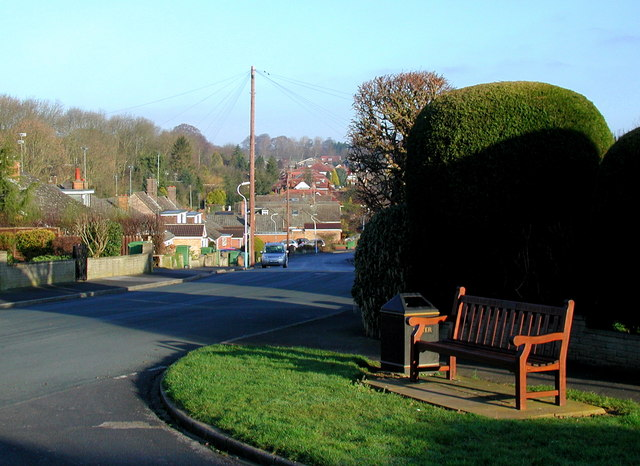
Top of Valley Drive (2009)

From the 1750s onwards many of the wealthy merchants and shipowners of Kingston upon Hull began moving their residences out of Hull, mostly westwards towards the higher ground of the wolds foothills and in an opposite direction to the prevailing winds, which carried the factory smells and other pollution eastward. The road from Hull to Anlaby and Kirk Ella was turnpiked in 1745. The influx of Hull merchants is also evidenced in the memorials and tombs in the village church. The fields around Kirk Ella, West Ella and Willerby were enclosed in by acts of 1796 and 1824.

Most of the early movement of Hull merchants was into residences on Church Lane: Richard Williamson, Hull merchant acquired land and built a house at No.4 Church Lane sometime after 1730, The Old Hall was rebuilt 1760, probably by Edward Burrow who acquired the property from another Hull merchant Thomas Haworth 1759; Thomas Bell built The Elms (demolished, the associated early 19th century Elm Lodge remains); and William Mowld established Wolfreton Hall in the same period, both on Church Lane, (Wolfreton Hall was later expanded, refronted in white brick and divided into Wolfreton Grange, and Wolfreton Hall); Kirk Ella House was built c. 1778. and a coach house added c. 1799; Trevayne at No.6 Church Lane was built c. 1830–40 on the site of a previous dwelling. Additionally the Vicarage (No.8), and an adjacent stable/coachhouse were built 1839.

Wolfreton House was built c. 1810/15 on the road to Beverley, east of the village centre, the associated stable block also dates to the late 18th/early 19th century. Other merchants had dwellings on Godman's Lane, now demolished; and on Packman Lane: Kirk Ella Hall, a 7 bay yellow-grey brick two storey building in a Tuscan style, was built (1778–79) for William Kirkby, Hull solicitor and white lead manufacturer, by expansion from a pre-existing house. (The Hall is now part of Kirkella Golf Club.) A lodge to the hall was built 1838. There was also a house South Ella, formerly Mount Ella, built for Hull banker Robert C. Pease in the early 19th century.

Other building developments in the 19th century included an infants school (No.11 Packman Lane, 1838, enlarged 1990s); and the Wheatsheaf Inn, rebuilt in 1870 in a Tudor revival style, in the 1850s, The Anchor. The village's population was 306 in 1851, up from 212 in 1801. The village consisted of no more than a few houses on Church Lane, and the east end of Godmans Lane.

In 1838 the parish of Kirk Ella became part of the Hunsley Beacon Division of the Harthill Wapentake. Extraparochial parts of the parish were transferred to the parish of Newington in 1878, and this area was transferred to the borough of Hull in 1882.

In 1885 the Hull and Barnsley Railway opened, passing north-east of the village centre. – Willerby and Kirk Ella railway station also opened 1885 (closed 1955).

By 1891 the population of the township had risen to 354.

=== 1900–2000 ===
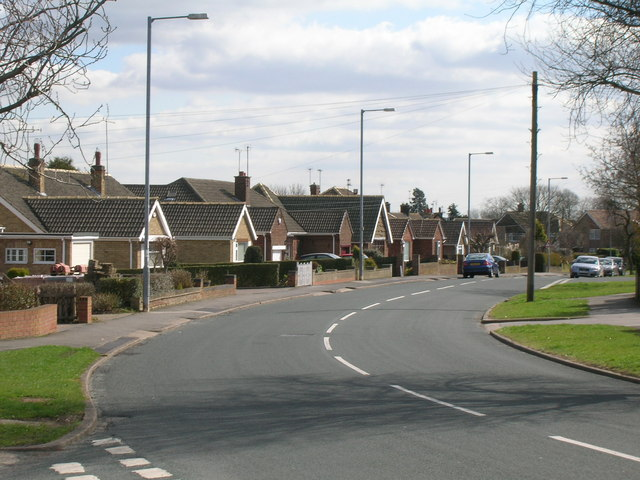
Mill Lane, built 1960s (2010)

By 1910 the town included a school which had been built on the corner of Mill Road (now Mill Lane) and West Ella Road, and a cemetery at the south end of Mill Lane, approximately 1/2 mile (800 metres) south of the village, built due to the fullness of the church cemetery. From 1850 to the 1930s there was minimal building growth within the village. An 18-hole golf course designed by James Braid was established west of the village from 1924 by the Hull Golf Club (1921) Limited.

In the 1930s the village began to grow substantially, with new housing developments, much of it semidetached or detached houses with large gardens. New estates were established on Beverley Road leading to Anlaby; on West Ella Road; far along Packman Lane leading to Riplingham, and centred around new roads such as West Ella Way; Westland Road; Elms Drive; Redland Drive; Fairfield Avenue; and St Andrews Mount. By the 1940s the new houses greatly outnumbered the dwellings that had existed up to the 1920s. In the post Second World War period further, during the 1950s to 1960s housing growth of a similar type took place, including new streets and estates on The Vale and South Ella Way off Mill Lane and at Wolfreton Garth. Further infill housing and expansion of housing to the south took place in the next decade, so that by the end of the 1970s an area of around one mile (1.5 kilometres) square was completely urbanised, and the development was contiguous with both the expanded villages of Willerby and Anlaby to the north and east. The extent of urban growth had reached a near peak, though further housing was built in the last years of the 20th century, particularly at the northern edge of the village, around Glenfield Drive; and the top of Valley Drive, Grundale and Pine Meadows in the 1970s, and areas such as Laxton Garth, Willingham Way and eastwards at St Julian's Wells were completed at the turn of the century; as well as minor infill developments.

In 1970, construction work ended on Wolfreton Upper School on South Ella Way. It was officially opened by Princess Margaret, Countess of Snowdon in May 1971.

West Ella Way in Kirk Ella was used as a filming location for the comedy film Clockwise (1986), including scenes featuring John Cleese and Alison Steadman.

=== Recent events (2000–present) ===
During the events of The Queen's Diamond Jubilee celebrations in 2012, the village celebrated by holding a village party in the centre of the village and a large fête at the church.

In 2015, Wolfreton Upper School was made surplus to requirements by the development of a new school building on the field at the rear of the Lower School site down Carr Lane in Willerby. The Upper School was demolished in 2016 and has since been replaced by a modern housing development. (See Wolfreton School.)

== Facilities ==
Kirk Ella has two public houses, The Wheatsheaf and The Beech Tree and several hairdressers and beauty parlours. The newsagents and post office closed in the 2010s. There is a recreational playing field on Beverley Road, opposite Haltemprice Leisure Centre. The village hall is opposite the police station, across the road from the Willerby Square car park.

== Notable people ==
- Robert Levet (1705–1782), a friend of Samuel Johnson's, was born in Kirk Ella.
- Fellow of the Royal Society of Edinburgh Ronald Audley Martineau Dixon (1871-1960) was resident in Wolfreton Hall.
- Actor Ian Carmichael would frequent Kirk Ella to visit his grandfather, who lived in the village.
- The singer David Whitfield lived in Kirk Ella in the 1960s.
- Sir Tom Courtenay would often be seen around the village when visiting his sister, who lived in Kirk Ella.
- Assem Allam, the British-Egyptian businessman, and former owner of Hull City A.F.C., lived in Kirk Ella.
- Chris Simpkin, former footballer with Hull City A.F.C. (1962–1971), lived in Kirk Ella.
- Dean Windass, former footballer with Hull City A.F.C, lives here.
- Hull-born comedian, actress and writer Isy Suttie spent her early years in Kirk Ella.
- Actress Hannah John-Kamen attended primary school in Kirk Ella and received secondary education at Hull Collegiate School.

== See also ==
- Listed buildings in Kirk Ella

== Gallery ==
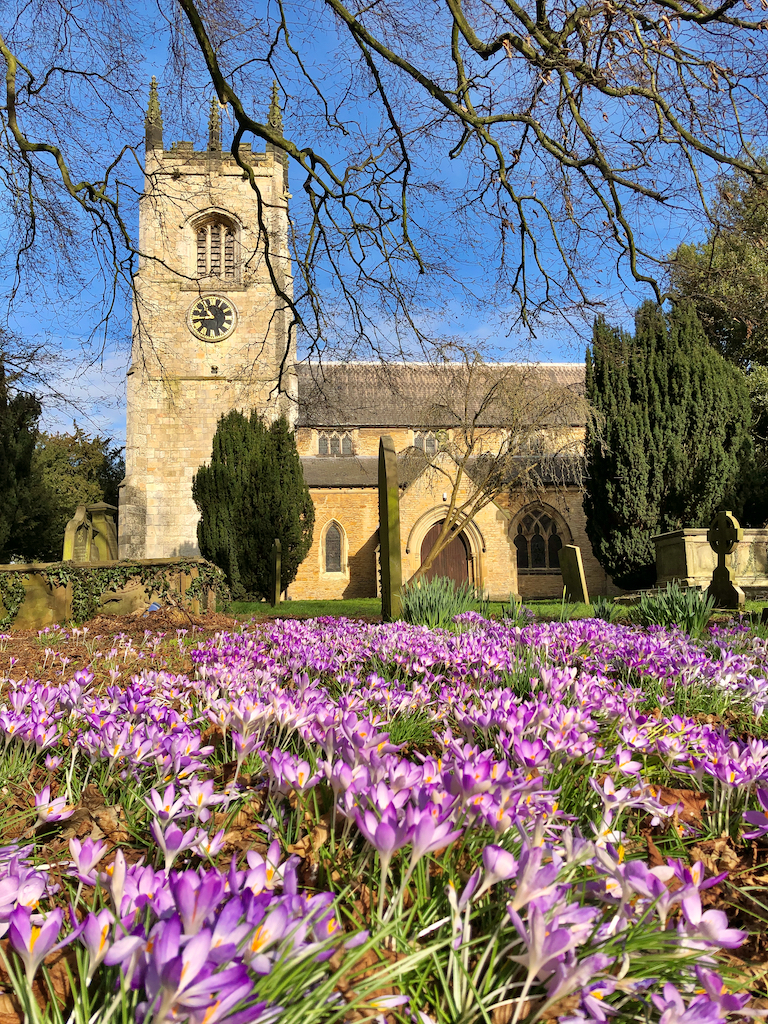
St Andrew's Church

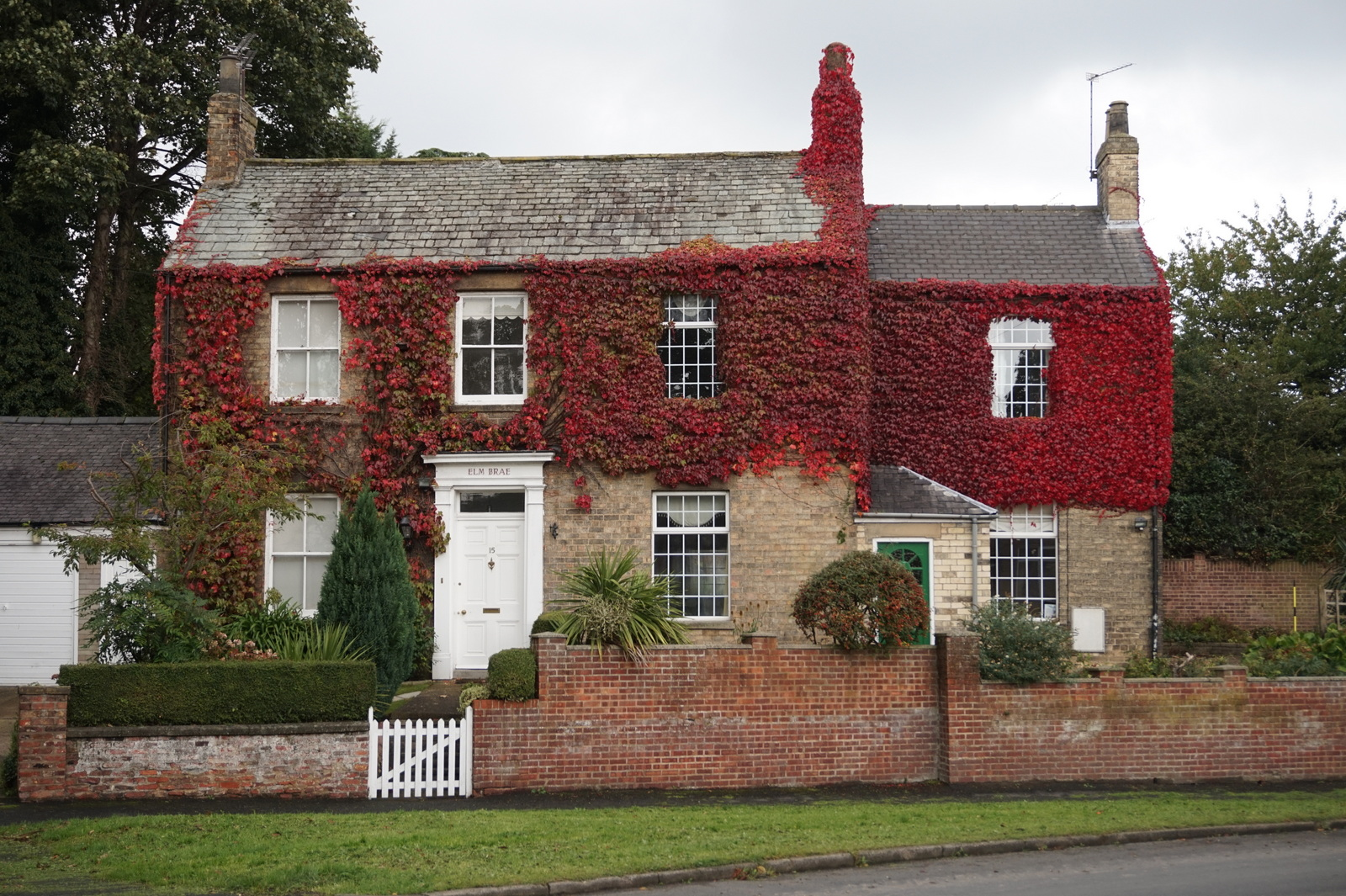
Elm Brae, Church Lane

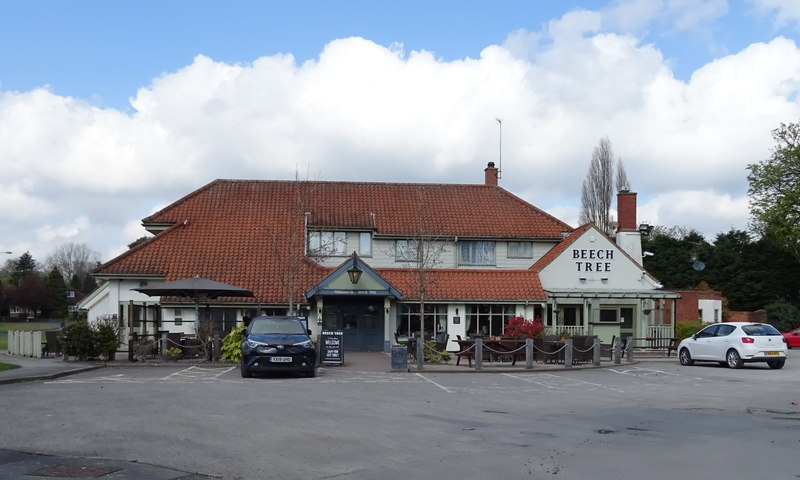
The Beech Tree public house, South Ella Way

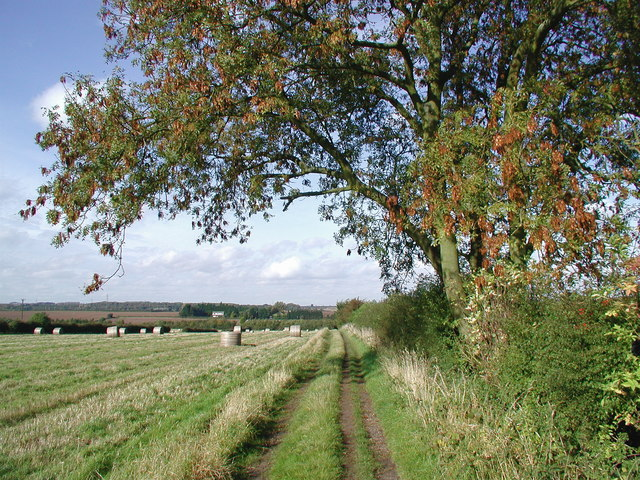
Public bridleway linking Riplingham Road and Great Gutter Lane

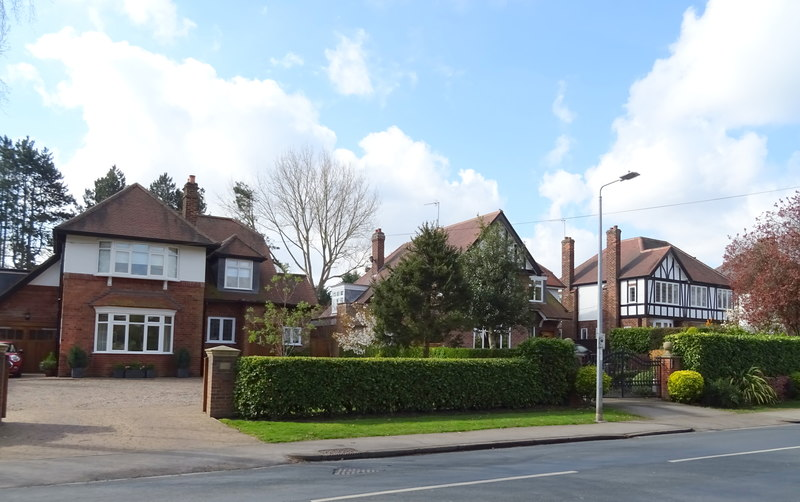
Housing on West Ella Road

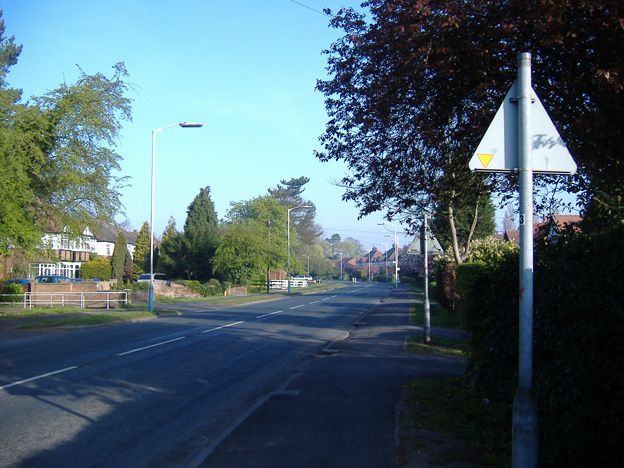
Beverley Road, one of the main roads through the village

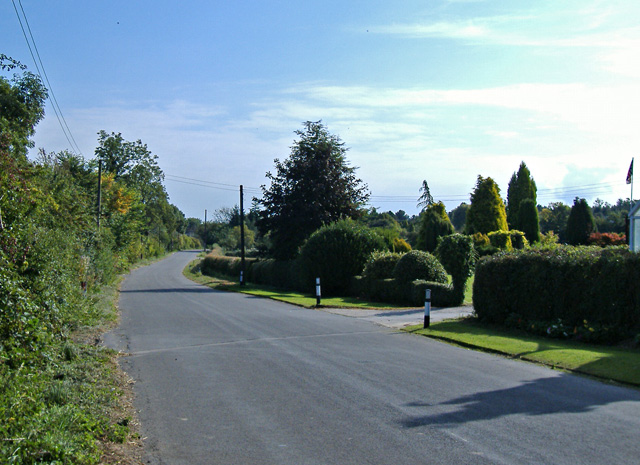
Great Gutter Lane West

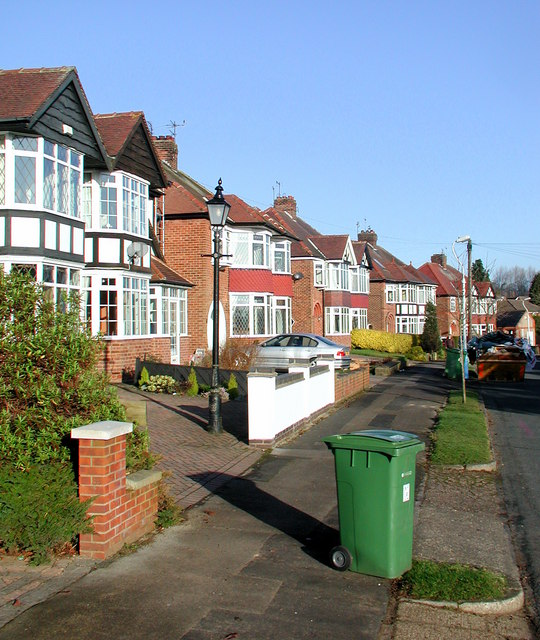
Northern section of Valley Drive

== Sources ==
- Allison, K. J. (1981). Hull Gent seeks country residence. East Yorkshire Local History Society.
- Bulmer, T. (1892). "Kirk Ella". Bulmer's History and Directory of East Yorkshire.
- "CONSERVATION AREA APPRAISAL – KIRK ELLA" (PDF). EAST RIDING OF YORKSHIRE COUNCIL. 2007.
- Pevsner, Nikolaus; Neave, David (1995). Yorkshire: York And the East Riding. Pevsner Architectural Guides (2nd ed.). Yale University Press. ISBN 0-300-09593-7.
- Tickell, John (1798). The History of the Town and County of Kingston Upon Hull. T. Lee.
