= Marlborough House set =

Social group around King Edward VII

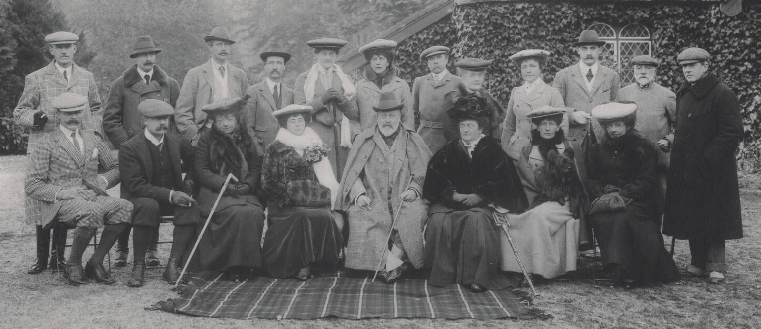
Members of the Marlborough House set, pictured on 23 November 1904

The Marlborough House set (also known as the smart set) was a social group that surrounded Albert Edward, Prince of Wales, from the 1870s into his reign as King Edward VII (1901–1910). The group was centred on Pall Mall, the site of Edward's residence, Marlborough House, and the Marlborough Club with which he was closely associated.

The Marlborough House set enjoyed horse racing, hunting, shooting and playing cards. They often visited country houses for weekend-long parties, at which adultery was common. The set was condemned by some in society for its loose morals, but increased Edward's popularity with the general public.

The set included some of the leading bankers, politicians and lawyers of the day, and some members were rewarded with positions at court upon Edward's accession to the throne.

== Establishment ==
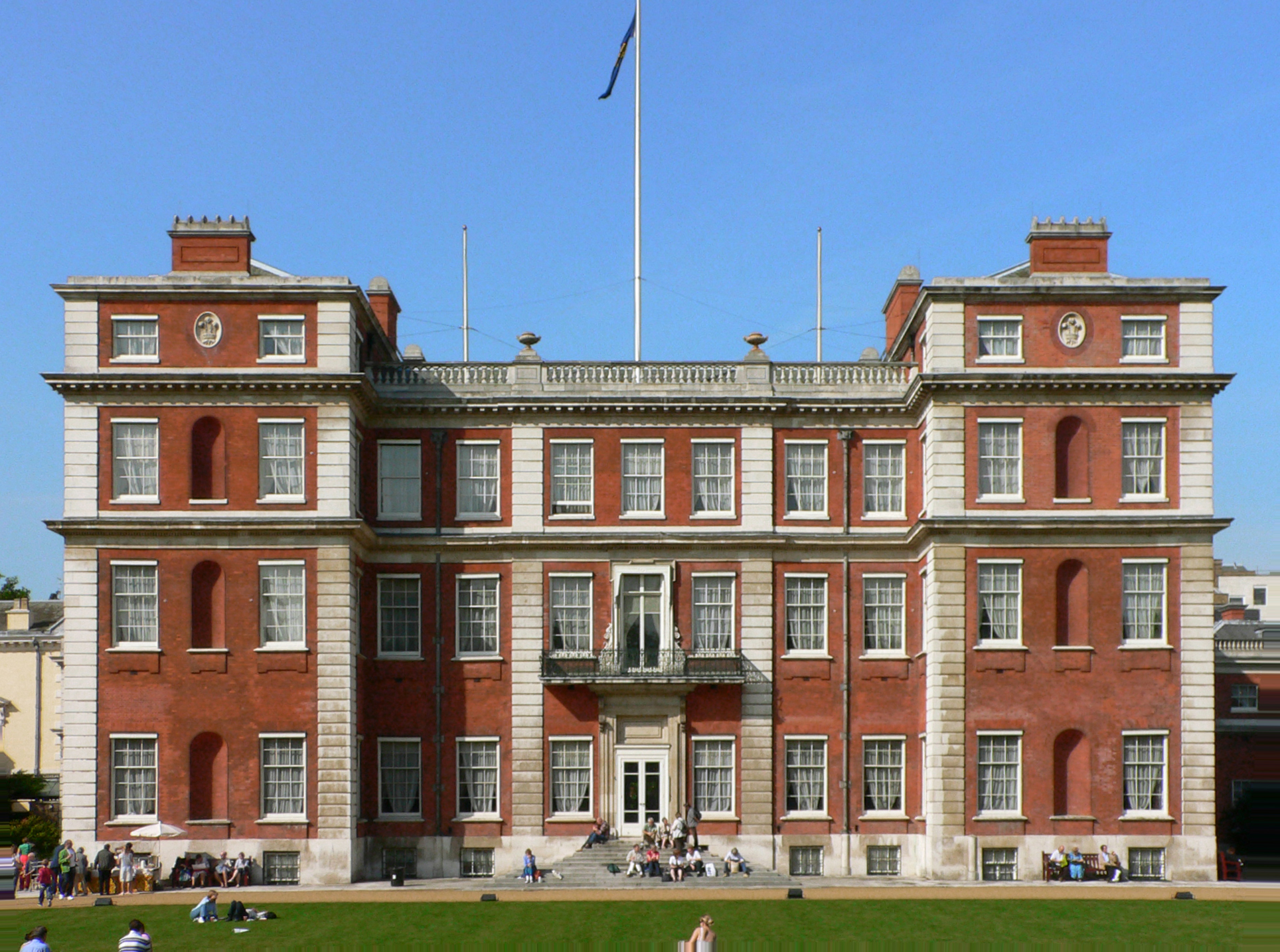
Marlborough House, pictured in 2008

The set was named after Marlborough House, a mansion situated between Pall Mall and The Mall in central London and located near to Buckingham Palace. Edward moved into Marlborough House in 1863 after his marriage to Alexandra of Denmark. At this time, the court of his mother Queen Victoria was in the early part of a long period for mourning after the 1861 death of her husband Albert, Prince Consort. Edward assumed many of the social responsibilities of the Crown, presiding over levees at the palace and holding balls and parties at Marlborough House. Edward had Marlborough House altered to provide larger ground floor rooms for entertaining and increased the staff there to more than 100 to support his functions, establishing in effect a second court.

When smoking was banned at the gentleman's club White's, Edward founded his own establishment, the Marlborough Club, in Pall Mall in 1869. Edward handpicked the first 400 members and the club soon became seen as an adjunct to his court at Marlborough House. The Marlborough House set developed in the 1870s around the house and club.

== Activities ==
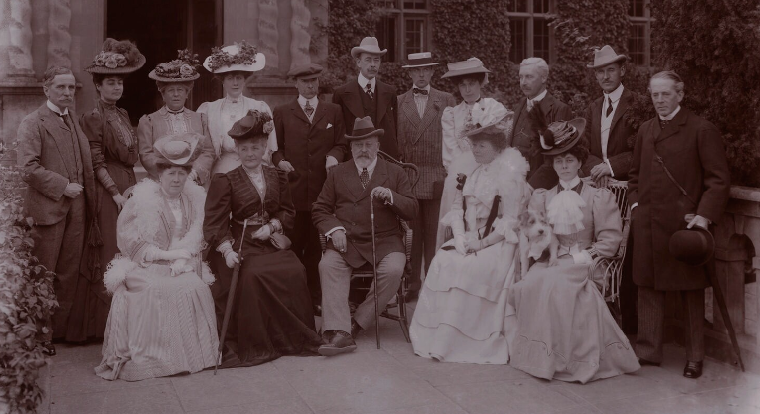
Members of the set, 10-17 September 1906

London society (ie. the Upper Class) grew in the 1880s and split into a number of separate cliques, of which the Marlborough House set was one part. The term "Marlborough House set" first came into use in the 1880s as it was noticed that the behaviour of its members was significantly different to the court around Victoria. According to historian James Stourton Edward wanted Marlborough House to be regarded as the "best kept house in London — even though many thought it had the worst morals". Edward was the undisputed leader of the set, which was the backdrop for many scandals. Edward expected the members to act with honour (though not necessarily with high morals). Adultery was common between the members, though divorce, as it would lead to public exposure, was seen as unacceptable. Edward enforced a strict formal dress code for the members of the set.

Key events in the social calendar of the set included horse race meetings, especially Royal Ascot, the Epsom Derby and the St Leger Stakes. Members also enjoyed shooting, hunting, playing cards and attending extravagant dinners. Edward and the set developed the concept of the country house weekend, ostensibly for the purposes of hunting and shooting. When the men returned to the host's house at tea time in the afternoon the women would dress in tea gowns, without corsets or petticoats and assignations would often take place. Country home owners spent vast sums to improve their buildings and furnishings ahead of these weekends. Witley Park in Surrey was a favourite location. Towards the end of the weekends the attendees were often formally photographed with Edward seated in the centre, the current hostess to his right and his current mistress to his left.

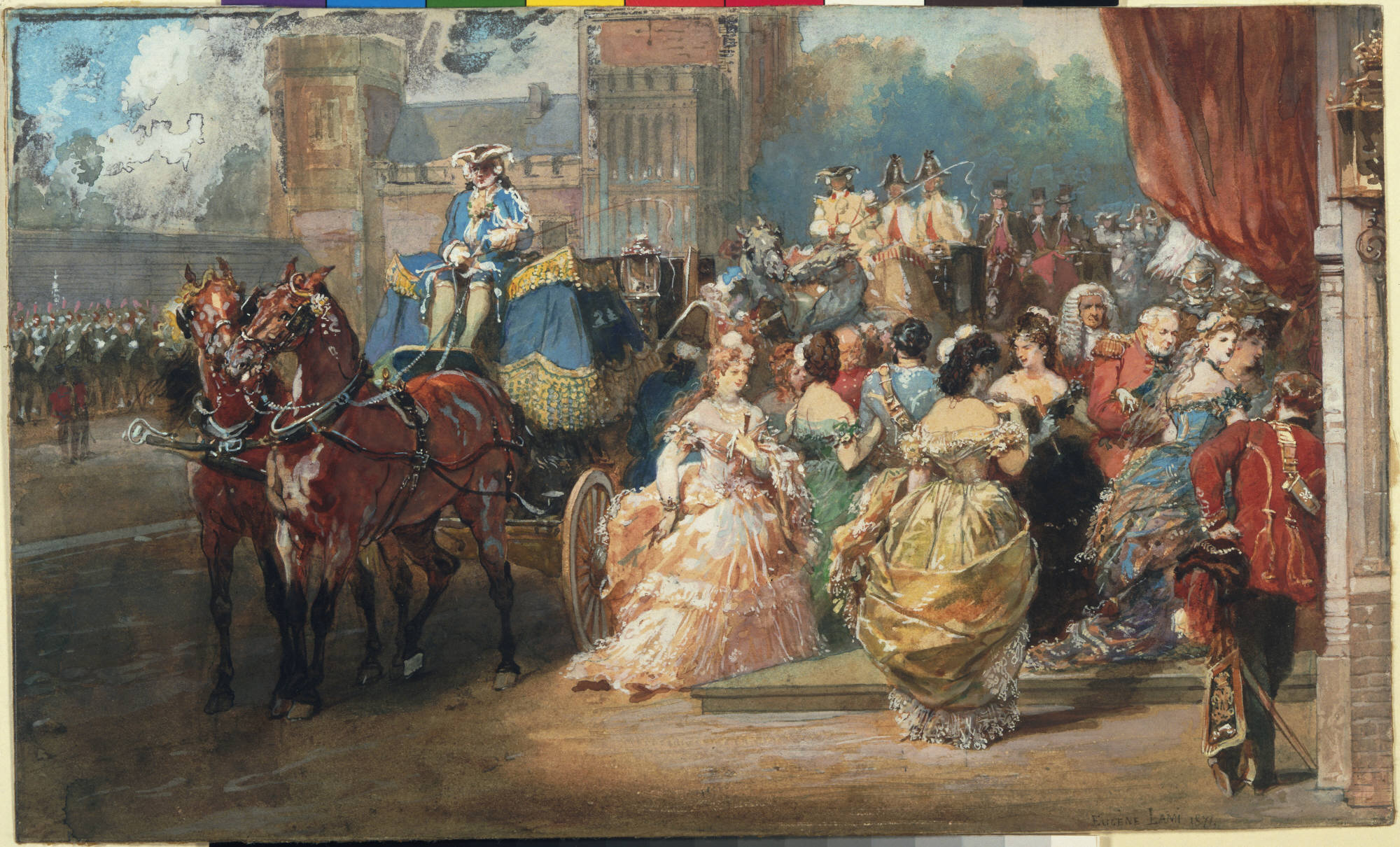
Entry to a Drawing Room at Marlborough House, 1871, watercolour by Eugène Lami. A "drawing room" was a type of daytime royal party.

The Marlborough House set sometimes met with The Souls, another of the late Victorian social sets, though The Souls tended to be more political and intellectual. A favourite joke of Edward's whilst meeting with the Marlborough House set was to pour brandy over the head of Conservative politician Christopher Sykes. Among the members Edward was nicknamed "Tum-Tum", on account of his being overweight.

The Marlborough House set had generally anti-Prussian (later German) and pro-Danish sympathies (the two countries were rivals and fought a war in 1864, and the Princess of Wales was Danish), which contrasted with the pro-German stance of Victoria's court, leading to tension between the two. Victoria disapproved of what she considered the low morals of the Marlborough House set, comparing it to the Carlton House set around the dissolute king George IV. At one point a group of aristocratic ladies, including the Duchess of Leeds and the Duchess of Bedford, complained about the Marlborough House set to the Archbishop of Canterbury, Edward White Benson. They asked Benson to conduct a moral mission to aristocratic women to address what they perceived as a decline in morals, which they attributed to the presence of American women in the set. In contrast the activities of the set boosted the popularity of the prince with the general public.

== Scandals ==
=== Mordaunt affair ===
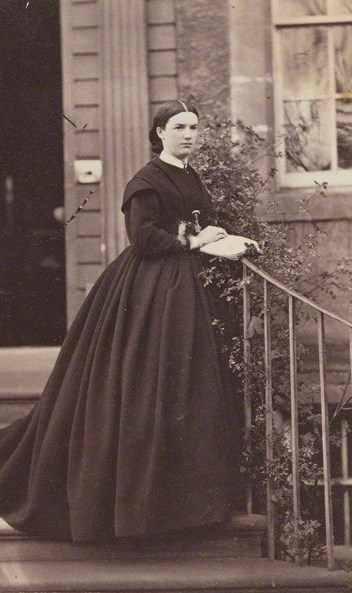
Harriet Mordaunt in the mid-1860s

Sir Charles Mordaunt, 10th Baronet had married, in 1866, the 18-year-old Harriet Moncreiffe. Edward and other members of the set were attracted to her and Mordaunt discovered that Edward was regularly visiting his wife in London and in the country. Lady Mordaunt confessed to her husband that her first child, born in 1869, was not his and the eye condition it suffered from was the result of venereal disease caught from a lover, naming Edward, Lord Cole. In 1869 Sir Charles filed for divorce on the grounds of adultery, naming Cole, Sir Frederick Johnstone and an unnamed man as co-respondents. Popular opinion was that the Prince of Wales was the un-named co-respondent. Although not cited, the prince was compelled to appear before the court as a witness. Lady Mordaunt was considered insane and confined to institutional care for the rest of her life; a divorce could not be granted until a change in the law in 1875. Prince Edward was afterwards featured in popular songs claiming him to be cuckolding the aristocracy.

=== Aylesford scandal ===
George Spencer-Churchill, Marquess of Blandford, his brother, Lord Randolph Churchill and his wife Lady Randolph Churchill were members of the set until Blandford had an affair with Edith, wife of the Earl of Aylesford, who were also members of the set. The pair fell in love and proposed to live together, writing to Aylesford whilst he was on a visit to India with Edward in 1875. Edward, who had also had an affair with Edith, supported Aylesford in his quest for a divorce. Randolph got access to love letters that had been sent by Edward to Edith and showed them to the Princess of Wales, hoping to pressure her into persuading her husband to end his support for a divorce. A duel between Edward and Randolph was narrowly avoided. The prime minister, Benjamin Disraeli, persuaded Aylesford to avoid a divorce trial which might have involved Edward giving evidence.

=== Royal baccarat scandal ===
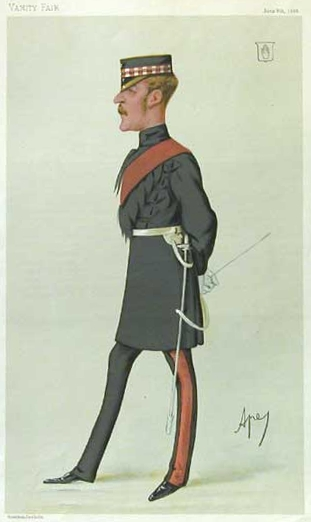
Gordon-Cumming as depicted by Carlo Pellegrini in Vanity Fair, 1880

The Royal baccarat scandal broke in 1890 after a game of baccarat played by members of the set, including Prince Edward, at Tranby Croft in Yorkshire. They had visited the house for the racing at nearby Doncaster racecourse. During the event one of the players, Sir William Gordon-Cumming, 4th Baronet, was accused of cheating. After consultation with the prince, Gordon-Cumming, who maintained his innocence, was persuaded to sign a document declaring he would never play cards again and the incident was to be kept secret. The scandal leaked to the press and in a subsequent court case for slander, instigated by Gordon-Cumming, Edward was forced to appear as a witness. The court found against Gordon-Cumming but the affair caused friction between Edward and Victoria.

== As monarch ==
When Edward became King Edward VII in 1901, many members of the set were rewarded with offices at court: Horace Farquhar became Master of the King's Household, Arthur Ellis Comptroller of the Lord Chamberlain's department, and Lord Suffield a lord-in-waiting. As King, Edward ceased to use Marlborough House which was used by Edward's son and the new Prince of Wales, George, and his wife, Mary of Teck.

== Members ==
The Marlborough House set included a wide variety of members beyond the traditional upper classes. Admission to the set was on the basis of personality, wealth and, for women, beauty. Members of the set included horse racing enthusiasts, bankers, actresses and opera singers as well as a large number of American heiresses who had married into the British aristocracy. Membership included a number of Jewish bankers of the Rothschild, Sassoon and Cassel families, who were not commonly accepted into high society in this period. A prominent member was Daisy Greville, Countess of Warwick, who had a long affair with Edward during the 1890s. She recalled that she disliked the inclusion of the bankers, not for their background or personalities but for their intelligence and understanding of finance; the other members of the set were generally spendthrifts. Among the bankers, Maurice de Hirsch joined in 1890 after paying off Edward's debts and Ernest Cassel did the same in 1896. The Jewish lawyer George Henry Lewis acted as an informal solicitor to the set and was said to know all its members' secrets.

The Marlborough House set was more open to new money figures than other parts of high society. These included the brewer Henry Allsopp and the Lister-Kaye family, whose money derived from cotton mills. The admission of new money represented a shift by Edward from the traditional aristocracy, many of whose members had bankrupted themselves in trying to entertain him.

=== List ===
The membership of the set was constantly changing. However several sources have given lists of those who were members at one time or another.

Principal members

The historian Jane Ridley, writing in the Oxford Dictionary of National Biography lists the following as the principal members of the set:

- Edward, Prince of Wales
- Alexandra of Denmark
- Francis Knollys (Edward's private secretary)
- Louisa Cavendish, Duchess of Manchester (a mistress of the robes to Victoria dismissed in 1859 for "her tone, her love of admiration and 'fast style'"; together with her lover, Lord Hartington, and Edward they formed the so-called "innermost trinity" of London society for about 40 years from 1866)
- Arthur Ellis (an equerry to Edward)
- Lord Charles Beresford (an equerry to Edward)
- Heneage Finch, 7th Earl of Aylesford and his wife Edith (but see above)
- George Sutherland-Leveson-Gower, 3rd Duke of Sutherland
- Prince Louis of Battenberg
- Maria, Lady Ailesbury
- Charles Yorke, 5th Earl of Hardwicke
- Maurice de Hirsch
- Charles Hardinge
- Thomas Lipton
- Ernest Cassel
- Reginald Brett, 2nd Viscount Esher
- Alice Keppel (Edward's mistress from 1898)
- Mrs Willie James
- Mrs Naylor-Leyland
- Jesusa Bellido y de los Heros, Marchioness of Santurce (a mistress of Edward's)

French sub-set

A small sub-set of members had significant connections to France and include:

- Mr and Mrs Standish
- Jeanne Seillière, Princess of Sagan
- Gaston, Marquis de Galliffet
- Antonin-Just-Léon-Marie de Noailles, Duke de Mouchy and his wife Anne Murat

Hamilton's list

Others, in addition to those listed previously, are given in an 1891 diary entry by civil servant Edward Walter Hamilton:

- Archibald Acheson, 4th Earl of Gosford and his wife Louisa Acheson, Countess of Gosford
- Edward Stanley, 4th Baron Stanley of Alderley
- Consuelo Montagu, Duchess of Manchester
- Georgina Ward, Countess of Dudley
- Arthur Sassoon
- John Lister-Kaye
- Emily Yznaga
- Margaret Williams-Bulkeley and her daughter Mrs Benjamin Guinness
- Henry Sturt, 1st Baron Alington and his daughters Owen and Hwfa
- Sir Leslie Falkiner, seventh baronet
- Gerald FitzGerald, 5th Duke of Leinster and his wife Hermione
- Don José Murrieta y del Campo, 1st Marquis of Santurce
- William Gerard, 2nd Baron Gerard and his wife Mary
- Henry Oppenheim
- Lord Randolph Churchill and his wife Lady Randolph Churchill
- John and Frances Horner
- Henry Wellesley, 3rd Duke of Wellington
- Charles Vane-Tempest-Stewart, 6th Marquess of Londonderry and his wife Theresa Vane-Tempest-Stewart, Marchioness of Londonderry
- Frederick Robinson, 4th Earl de Grey and his wife Constance, Countess de Grey
- Francis Greville, Lord Brooke (husband of Daisy Greville)
- Lord Carrington
- Charles Harbord, 5th Baron Suffield (lord of the bedchamber to Edward) and his wife Cecilia
- Sir William Carrington
- Lord Algernon Gordon-Lennox
- Lord Hartington
- Oliver Montagu (an equerry to Edward and confidant of Princess Alexandra)
- J. C. Sykes
- Horace Farquhar
- Henry Chaplin
- Sir Lawrence Oliphant
- Luís Pinto de Soveral, 1st Marquis of Soveral
- John Baring
- Francis Mildmay, 1st Baron Mildmay of Flete
- Montague Guest

In addition Hamilton names Archibald Primrose, 5th Earl of Rosebery as being "of course of the set, but as a matter of fact is not much in it".

National Portrait Gallery list

In addition to those mentioned in the above lists the National Portrait Gallery lists the following as members:

- Spencer Cavendish, 8th Duke of Devonshire
- Winifred Selina Sturt (wife of Charles Hardinge)
- Charles Stanhope, 8th Earl of Harrington
- Robert Kingscote
- William Knollys (father of Francis Knollys)
- Thomas Coke, 2nd Earl of Leicester
- Natica Yznaga (wife of John Lister-Kaye)
- Mildred Cecilia Harriet, Lady Montagu
- Sir Charles Mordaunt, 10th Baronet and his wife Harriet Mordaunt (but see above)
- Maurice Towneley-O'Hagan, 3rd Baron O'Hagan
- George Payne
- John Baring, 2nd Baron Revelstoke
- Reuben David Sassoon
- Edward Montagu-Stuart-Wortley-Mackenzie, 1st Earl of Wharncliffe
- Owen Williams
