= Anlaby with Anlaby Common =

Civil parish in the East Riding of Yorkshire, England

Coordinates: 53°44.5′N 0°25′W

- Civil parish
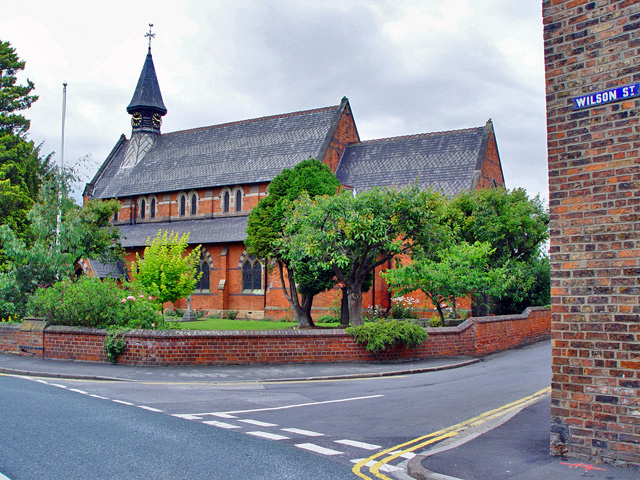
- St Peter's Church, Anlaby

- Population: 9,794 (2011 census)
- OS grid reference: TA044284
- Civil parish: Anlaby with Anlaby Common
- Unitary authority: East Riding of Yorkshire
- Ceremonial county: East Riding of Yorkshire
- Region: Yorkshire and the Humber
- Country: England
- Sovereign state: United Kingdom
- Post town: HULL
- Postcode district: HU10
- Dialling code: 01482
- Police: Humberside
- Fire: Humberside
- Ambulance: Yorkshire
- UK Parliament: Kingston upon Hull West and Haltemprice
- Website: Anlaby with Anlaby Common Parish Council

Anlaby with Anlaby Common is a civil parish in the East Riding of Yorkshire, England. The parish includes the village suburb of Anlaby and the part of the area known as Anlaby Common.

== Geography ==
Anlaby with Anlaby Common is situated to the west of Kingston upon Hull city boundary and covers an area of 514.885 hectares (1,272.31 acres). It consists of the villages of Anlaby and Anlaby Common. It also includes the remaining part of the land area known as Anlaby Common, to the south of Anlaby village, which is primarily enclosed agricultural land. The parish borders Willerby and Kirk Ella to the north, Swanland to the west, Hessle to the south, and the unparished area of Hull to the east. The eastern part of the parish is low-lying at 5 metres (16 ft) above sea level or less, but rises to 50 metres (160 ft) at the western fringe, approaching the foothills of the Yorkshire Wolds.

The land to the south of Anlaby within the parish includes the former house of Tranby Croft (as of 2014 Hull Collegiate School), and Sidney Smith School.

According to the 2011 UK census, Anlaby with Anlaby Common parish had a population of 9,794, a reduction from the 2001 UK census figure of 9,883.

It does not include the Hull suburb of Anlaby Park which is inside Hull's city limits.

== See also ==
- Listed buildings in Anlaby with Anlaby Common
