= Berkeley Levett =

British royal family guard

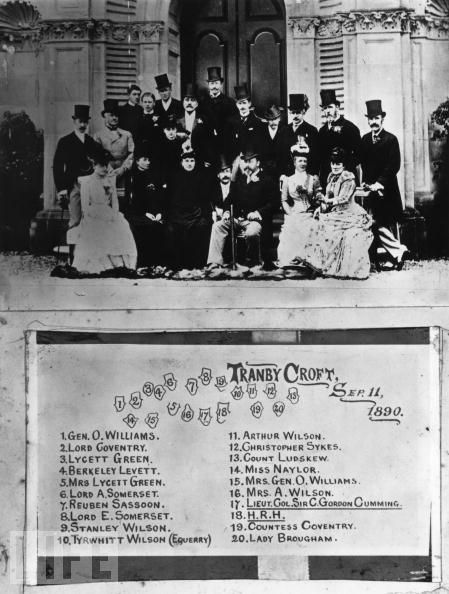
Assembled partygoers at Tranby Croft, 11 September 1890. The Royal Baccarat Scandal. Pictured are Capt. Berkeley Levett and Edward, Prince of Wales and others

Berkeley John Talbot Levett, CVO (11 November 1863 – 1 November 1941) was a Major in the Scots Guards and later a Gentleman Usher for the royal family. He was a witness in the Royal baccarat scandal of 1890 in which the future King Edward VII was drawn into a gambling dispute which painted him in an unflattering light.

== Life and career ==
The son of Colonel Theophilus John Levett of Wychnor Park, Member of Parliament for Lichfield, and member of an ancient family, Levett enjoyed playing cards and saw himself as a dashing figure in society circles. He was commissioned a lieutenant in the Scots Guards on 16 December 1885, an appointment to one of the most prestigious regiments, which further allowed him to advance his contacts in the establishment.

On 8 September 1890, the Scots Guards officer was in the company of royalty and fellow socialites at Tranby Croft in Yorkshire when the incident which set off the Royal Baccarat Scandal occurred. At the time, Levett was a soldier and bon vivant said to be the best-dressed man in London. One society publication referred to him as the "noted soldier and dandy." The subsequent events led to a slander trial at which Levett was one of the defendants. Although the defendants won the case, public mood was against them.

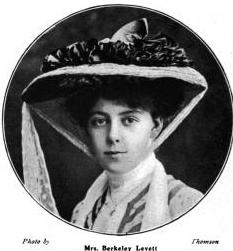
Sibell Bass Levett, daughter of brewery heir Hamar Alfred Bass, wife of Major Berkeley Levett, 1905

During the parties feting the German Emperor Wilheim II during his July 1891 London visit, The New York Times noted, "the Pall Mall Gazette this afternoon, in referring to the garden party (for the Emperor), gives great prominence to the fact that Mr. and Mrs. Arthur Wilson, Mr. and Mrs. E. Lycett Greene, and Lieut. Berkeley Levett, all of whom were prominent in the Tranby Croft baccarat scandal, were among the guests at the garden party."

Berkeley Levett served as Aide-de-camp in India to William Mansfield, 1st Viscount Sandhurst who was Governor of Bombay from 1895 to 1900, during which he was promoted to captain on 15 November 1897. Back in England, Levett married on 2 June 1900 Sibell Lucia Bass of the Bass brewery family, daughter of Hamar Alfred Bass, Member of Parliament. In September 1902 he retired from the army. Having sold his share of the family's Staffordshire estates, he and his wife lived in Lancaster Gate, London; Cottington, Sidmouth, Devon; and Saint-Jean-Cap-Ferrat, France, often turning up at society events before World War I.

Berkeley Levett kept up his royal connections while serving as one of the Gentleman Ushers for the Royal Household from 1 April 1919 to 1 December 1931. Later Levett was promoted to the rank of Major. He and his wife had two sons, one of whom was killed in World War I.

== Baccarat scandal ==
Levett was drawn into the scandal after a night in which Sir William Gordon-Cumming, 4th Baronet, a fellow officer from the Scots Guards, was accused of cheating at Baccarat, a card game. Levett testified later that he had witnessed the cheating. Although Gordon-Cumming maintained that he had not cheated and the others had been mistaken, he had when confronted signed a statement pledging never to play cards again in return for an agreement that no-one present would speak again of what had happened. The assembled players feared the worst if the scandal leaked. For four months afterwards, Sir William split his time between his Scottish estates, his Scots Guards regiment, his wealthy American fiancée and his Paris club, hoping that the others would hold to their pledge.

The secret pact did not hold. An anonymous letter from Paris informed Sir William that gossips on the Continent were chattering about the events of that evening – and about Gordon-Cumming's alleged cheating. Enraged, Sir William brought suit against those present, including Berkeley Levett, charging slander. When the suit came to court in June 1891, it was a stylish affair: only those observers sporting a note from the Lord Chief Justice were admitted. The cream of society turned out dressed as though for Royal Ascot.

Levett testified under oath, and although the jury ultimately ruled for him and the rest of the defendants, the damage was done. Sir William was drummed out of his regiment and forced to resign from his clubs. The future King, who was required to testify and thus reveal his penchant for card-playing, was outraged. "Thank God", said the future King, "the army and society are now well rid of such a damned blackguard."

The royal reputation had been called into question. Newspapers and public opinion sided squarely with Sir William. Word in the street largely blamed the future King. In circles like Berkeley Levett's, consensus was the King was to blame, but for a different reason: the contentious card game had transpired at the estate of a newly rich shipping millionaire.

The jury took 10 minutes to find all the defendants not guilty and award them their legal costs. It was not a popular decision. The crowd hissed and booed the jurors, and tried to attack the defendants as they left the courtroom.

== See also ==
- List of Gentlemen Ushers
