= Anlaby House =

Georgian country house in Anlaby, East Riding of Yorkshire, England

Coordinates: 53.7432°N 0.4365°W

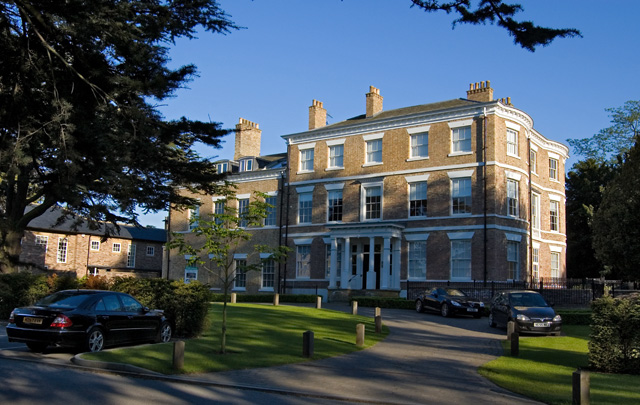
Anlaby House

Anlaby House is a former Georgian country house at Anlaby, near Hull, in the East Riding of Yorkshire, England, which has since been converted to luxury apartments. It is a grade II listed building.

Constructed of yellow brick with stone dressing and a slate roof, the main range is built in three storeys with a 5-bay frontage.

== History ==
Anlaby House was originally built in 1790 for Hull merchant John Boyes and sold shortly afterwards to William Voase in 1818. He left it to his niece Fanny, who had married Thomas Ringrose, on condition they adopted the surname Voase. Fanny was still living there in 1892. William Ringrose-Voase lived in the house at around the turn of the century and continued to do so until 1912. He was a J.P. for the East Riding and died in 1913, leaving a son John Reginald. The Voase family continued to occupy the estate until 1936, when it became council premises on the formation of Haltemprice Urban District Council.

During the Second World War the house was used as a store and depot for air raid precautions. From 1974 to 1999 it was the offices of the Chief Executive of Beverley Borough Council. East Riding of Yorkshire Council then sold the property in 1999 as surplus to requirements. After standing empty for five years it was converted into luxury apartments.

== See also ==
- Listed buildings in Anlaby with Anlaby Common
