= Anlaby Common =

Suburb of Kingston upon Hull, England

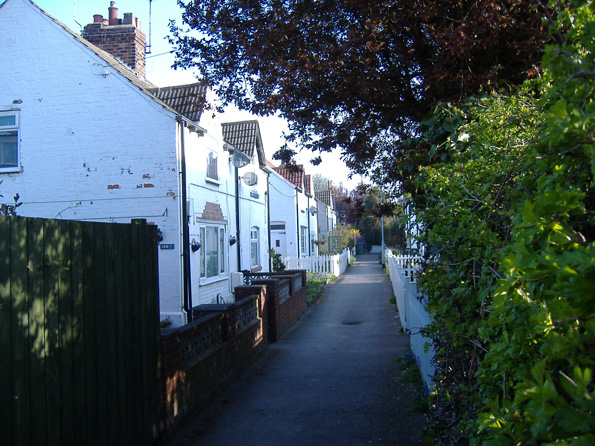
Anlaby Avenue, Anlaby Common

Anlaby Common is former common land, now an outer suburb of Kingston upon Hull. The area includes the residential areas which are located on the western urban fringe of Hull; the B1231 road (Hull Road/Springfield Way) passes through all of Anlaby Common's estates, east to west.

As of 2011 the western part of the land is located in the civil parish of Anlaby with Anlaby Common in the East Riding of Yorkshire; whilst the eastern part of the land is located in Kingston upon Hull.

== Geography ==
Historically Anlaby Common was an area of agricultural land east of Anlaby; the historic 'Anlaby Common' area now includes several areas of housing, including areas known as East Ella, Anlaby Park, and Anlaby Common; the historic Anlaby Common area includes land within both the East Riding of Yorkshire and the city of Hull.

The present urban development in the area is essentially contiguous with that of Hull, as of 2006 there is some green space including playing fields separating the area and Anlaby village, though housing development along Anlaby Road is almost continuous.

The area includes the churches of Anlaby Park Methodist Church and St Mark's Anglican parish church; these churches work closely together under the name "Common Ground". Anlaby Common is near the small suburb of East Ella.

== History ==
In the 1850s Anlaby Common was enclosed land in open countryside to the east of the village of Anlaby. (Note: 53.747307°N 0.413042°W, Anlaby Common (approximate)) The area included a number of farms, and two large houses, Spring Villa (built 1840), and East Ella (built 1842 (Note: 53.745737°N 0.394713°W, East Ella house (site of))). The Hull and Kirk Ella Trust road (later Anlaby Road) ran east west through the area; a northern border approximated to Derringham Dike/Spring Bank waterway and road, whilst to the south was Hessle common across fields.

By the 1890s the Hull, Barnsley and West Riding Junction Railway (HB&WRJnc.Rlwy.) had been constructed, east–west, across the land (c. 1880s), and construction of terraced and court housing had taken place north-west of Spring Villa (Ditmas Avenue etc.), on the north side of Anlaby Road. The HB&WRJnc.Rlwy built a locomotive works (Springhead locomotive works), (Note: 53.748691°N 0.404278°W, Springhead locomotive works (site of)) and sidings in the north-eastern part of the common.

By 1910 the locomotive works and sidings had been considerably expanded, and by the mid 1920s the housing estate of Anlaby Park had been built (begun 1911 as a private development on the grounds of Spring Villa, (Note: 53.742823°N 0.406416°W, Anlaby Park) as well as the Almhouses Lee's Rest Houses; (Note: 53.743497°N 0.401568°W, Lee's Almshouses) to the east, the former East Ella house had been redeveloped as part of the White City Pleasure Grounds, with additional buildings including dance and concert halls. To the north of Lee's Rest Homes a second almshouse, Trinity House Almshouses, was built 1938–40. (Note: 53.745984°N 0.400545°W, Trinity House Almshouses)

A large fire destroyed the White City stadium in 1938. Remaining parts of the pleasure ground were demolished in 1945, and East Ella house in around 1951. Temporary housing was constructed on the grounds in the post Second World War period (Arcon Drive, demolished and redeveloped 1977).

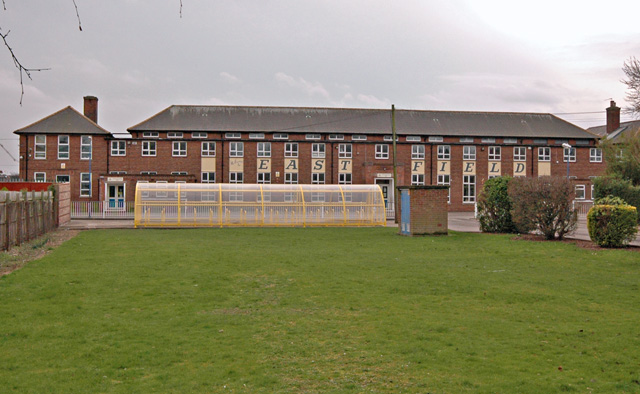
Eastfield school, est. 1930, expanded 1936 (2008)

In the mid 20th century housing development became more extensive, and became contiguous with the westward urban spread of Hull, as well as with the suburb of Gipsyville to the south-east, with building south of Anlaby Road in the East Ella area; on the north side of the road, north of Anlaby Park; as well as towards Anlaby village west of Anlaby Park. Eastfield School was established in East Ella south of Anlaby Road in 1930 as a 400 place junior and infants school, (Note: 53.743731°N 0.396087°W, Eastfield school) and expanded 1936 with 400 senior places; in 1945 it became Eastfield High School.

A cinema was built on the corner of Calvert Lane and Spring Bank West in 1938, the Priory. (Note: 53.749741°N 0.395579°W, former Priory Cinema) The cinema closed 1951, and was later used as shops. It is now a Heron Foods small supermarket.

Further housing development took place on the western part of the area in the second half of the 20th century, with housing development extending south across Hessle common by the 1960s, with Sydney Smith High School built in fields westwards, and south of Anlaby. A high rise at Lindsey Place on the East Ella hall site was completed 1964. (Note: 53.745839°N 0.395580°W, Lindsey Place (highrise)) By the 1970s housing had further expanded and northwards over part of the site of the defunct railway sidings, with further development on former railway land in the 1980s and 1990s. The urban spread of Hull became essentially continuous to Anlaby by the 1970s north of Anlaby Road.

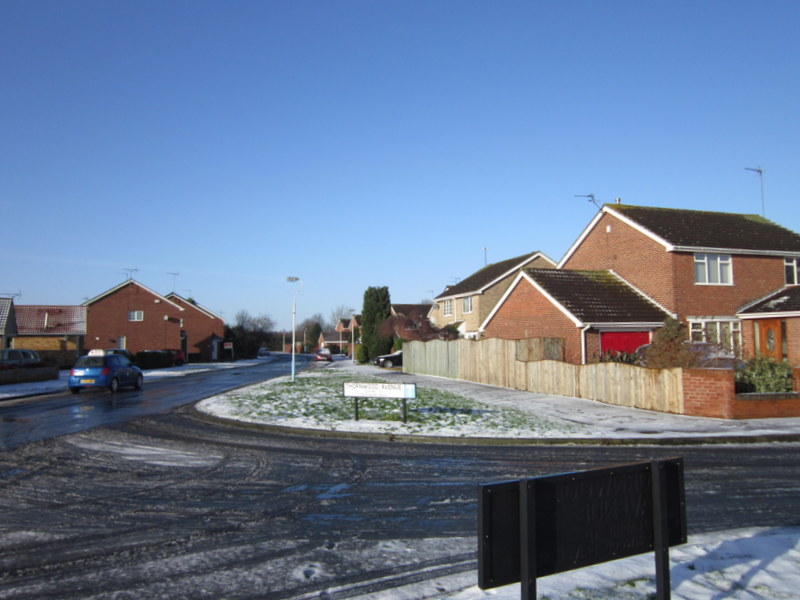
Maplewood and Thornwood Avenues

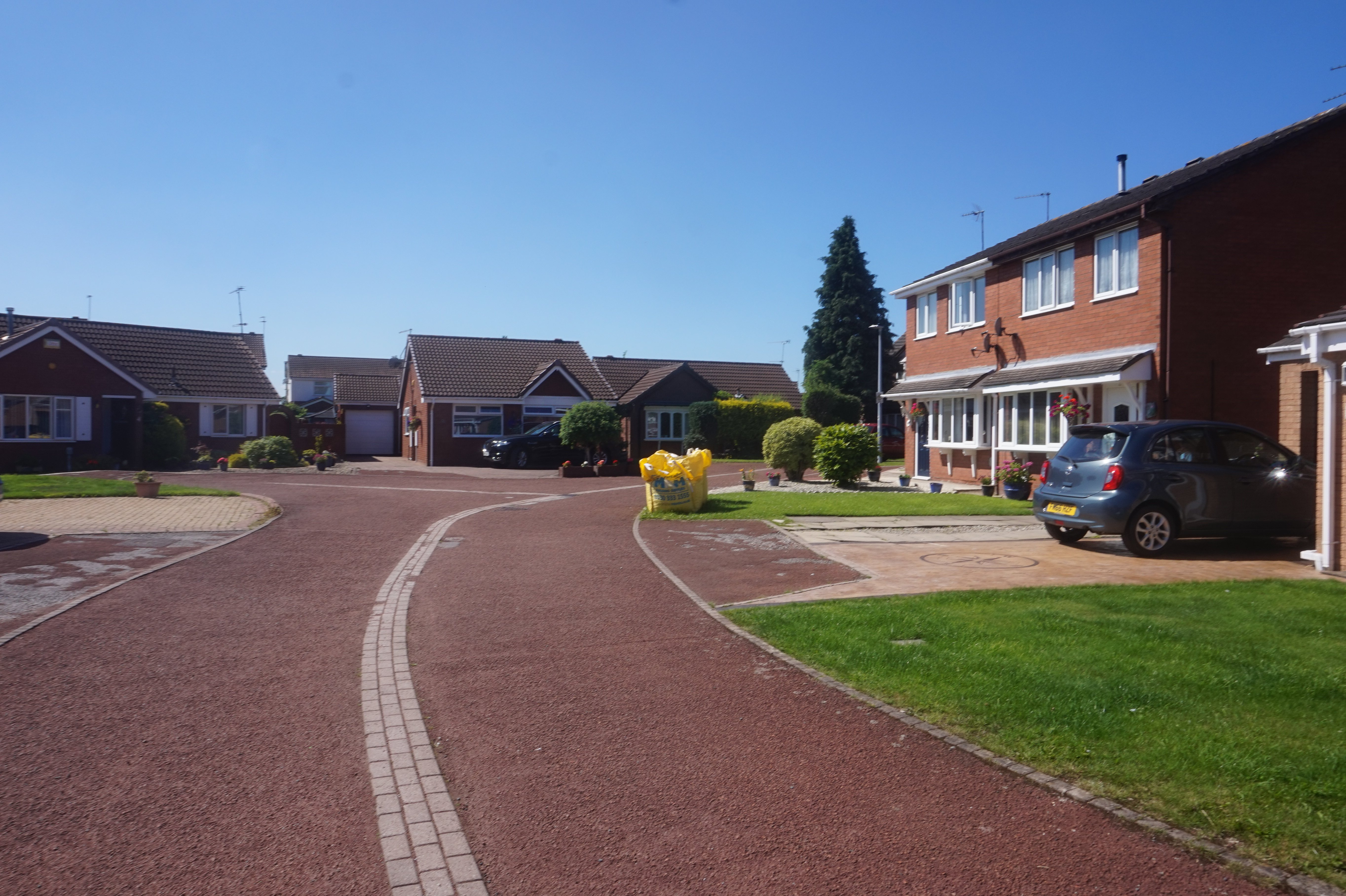
Lavender Walk

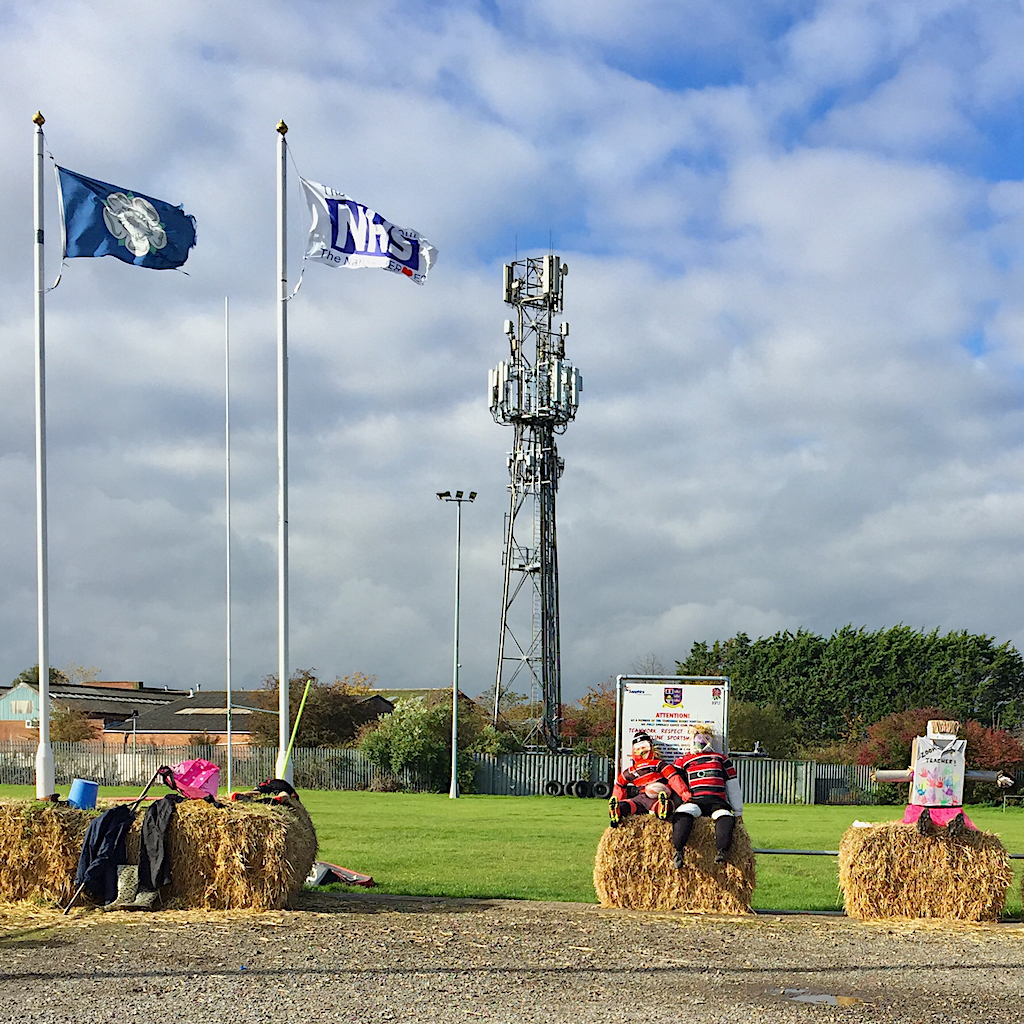
Hullensians Rugby Club

== See also ==
- Listed buildings in Anlaby with Anlaby Common
