= Tranby School =

- The school's logo, in use as of January 2023

Location
- Tranby Croft; Anlaby, East Riding of Yorkshire, HU10 7EH; England
- 53.740270°N 0.448350°W

Information
- Type: Private day school
- Religious affiliation: Church of England
- Established: 1330; 696 years ago (Hull Grammar School); 1890; 136 years ago (Hull High School for Girls); 2004, 2005; 21 years ago (merger into current school)
- Principal: Chris Wainman
- Staff: 100 (approx.)
- Gender: Mixed
- Age: 3 to 18
- Enrolment: 500 (approx.)
- Houses: 4 - Venn; Johnson; Marvel; Holtby
- Colours: White and blue (2005-2021 Maroon, navy blue and gold)
- Former pupils: Old Collegians
- Affiliation: United Church Schools Trust
- Website: https://www.tranby.org.uk/

Tranby School, commonly known in the area as the 'Collegiate' or 'Tranby Croft', is a co-educational private day school in Anlaby, near Hull, in the East Riding of Yorkshire, England. It was founded in 2005 as a result of a merger of two of the area's independent schools and is a member of the United Church Schools Trust.

The school was known as Hull Collegiate from its establishment in 2005 until September 2021.

== History ==
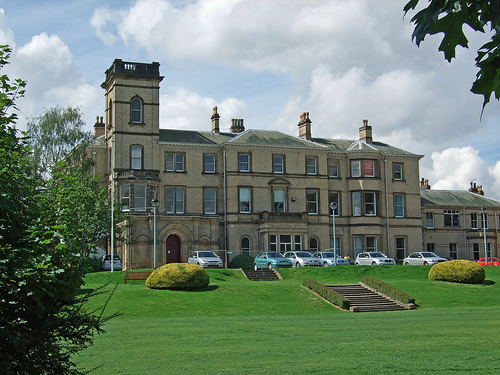
Tranby Croft, the site of the school

Following the renaming of the historic Hull Grammar School as the William Gee School for Boys in 1988, the name was acquired and used for a new independent school which opened in 1989. In 1991, Nord Anglia Education PLC, an education and training company, acquired the new school from the administrator for £900,000. By 2003 the school (net asset value of £1,800,000) hosted 450 pupils - boys and girls - from two to 18 years of age, and registered a turnover of £2,400,000, of which £280,000 went to Nord Anglia. The School was purchased from Nord Anglia for £4,180,000 by the United Church Schools Company (affiliated to the Church of England), and merged in September 2005 with Hull High School for Girls (owned by the Company since 1890), a co-educational Independent School (with a girls-only junior and senior school, ages 7–18) of similar size and strength.

This merged Hull Collegiate School is situated on the former Hull High School site 4 miles (6.4 km) to the west of Hull and 1 mile (1.6 km) north east of the Humber Bridge, the school is based at Tranby Croft, a Victorian mansion with over 12 acres (49,000 m^{2}) of landscaped grounds, a small wood and an AstroTurf pitch.

The mansion was previously home to shipbuilder Arthur Wilson during the late Victorian Era. He hosted the Prince of Wales, later King Edward VIII, at a party. The events at the party would later lead to the royal baccarat scandal.

The Preparatory School, opened in 2004, is housed in a purpose-built facility on the same site; a senior school building was opened in 2005, completing a multimillion-pound investment by parent company United Church Schools Trust. The school was renamed Tranby in 2021, after the site, Tranby Croft.

== Notable alumni and teachers ==
- Andrew Marvell (1621–78): English metaphysical poet and patriot, educated at Hull Grammar School (his father, the Rev. Andrew Marvell M.A., was a master at the School)
- William Wilberforce, politician and anti-slavery campaigner (1759-1833) was educated at Hull Grammar School for a short time from c.1767.
- Dorothy L. Sayers, novelist: taught Modern Languages at Hull High School for Girls from 1915 to 1917
- Hannah John-Kamen, actress: former student
- Zara Holland, model and television personality, former Miss Great Britain
