= Listed buildings in Anlaby with Anlaby Common =

Anlaby with Anlaby Common is a civil parish in the county of the East Riding of Yorkshire, England. It contains five listed buildings that are recorded in the National Heritage List for England. All the listed buildings are designated at Grade II, the lowest of the three grades, which is applied to "buildings of national importance and special interest". The parish contains the village suburbs of Anlaby and Anlaby Common to the west of Kingston upon Hull. The listed buildings consist of houses and associated structures.

== Buildings ==
Name and location	Photograph	Date	Notes
The Old Hall; 53.74628°N 0.43131°W		c. 1680	The house is in red brick on a plinth, with a tile roof. There are two storeys and seven bays, with a two-storey gabled porch in the centre. This contains a round-arched doorway with stone imposts and a keystone, and on the side walls are heart-shaped piercings. The windows are sashes under segmental brick arches. On the right bay is a projecting garage doorway. Inside the house is an inglenook fireplace.
Anlaby House; 53.74323°N 0.43666°W		Late 18th century	The house was extended in the 19th century, and has since been used for other purposes. It is in yellow brick, with stone dressings, floor and sill bands, modillion eaves cornices and hipped slate roofs. The main range has three storeys and five bays. In the centre is a Tuscan tetrastyle portico with an entablature, a frieze with roundels and a modillion cornice. The windows are sashes under cambered wedge lintels. The extension to the left has two storeys and attics, and four bays. It contains similar windows and has four segmental-headed roof dormers.
Gates, gate piers and walls, Anlaby House; 53.74359°N 0.43832°W		Early 19th century	Flanking the entrance to the drive are square stone piers on a moulded plinth. Each pier has a central recessed round panel with rosettes, partly embraced by oblong panels. Above is a frieze with a mask and foliage, a cornice with egg and dart moulding, and bases for finials. The piers are supported by volute brackets with fruit and foliage. The gates are in cast iron. Outside the piers are curving coped walls in white brick with stone dressings on a low plinth, forming a semicircular plan. The end piers have pyramidal caps.
Tranby Croft; 53.74035°N 0.44827°W		1874–76	A large house that was extended and later used as a school. It is in yellow brick with stone dressings, floor and sill bands, end pilasters, a cornice, and slate roofs, and is in Italianate style. There are three storeys and nine bays, the middle three bays projecting, and the left bay rising as a four-storey tower. On the left is a projecting porch and a doorway with a moulded round arch, pilasters and an impost band. In the centre is a square bay window with pilasters, a frieze and a balustraded parapet. The eight bay contains a full-height canted bay window. Most of the other windows are sashes. The tower has a canted bay window with a balustrade on the first floor, a round-headed window with a keystone on the top floor, and a balustraded parapet.
Former stable block, Tranby Croft; 53.74111°N 0.45001°W		1874	The buildings are in yellow brick on a red brick plinth, with dressings in red brick, floor and sill bands, and hipped Welsh slate roofs. They form a courtyard with four ranges, and at the northeast corner is a tower. The east entrance range has a central round arch flanked by pilasters with moulded capitals, and an initialled and dated keystone. Above are two round-headed windows and a gable with overhanging eaves. The tower has four storeys, with round-arched windows, one on each side of the lower two storeys, two on the third storey and three on the top floor. Under the top floor is an arched corbel table, and the tower is surmounted by a pyramidal roof with a bracketed corbel table. On the roof of the west range is a square wooden cupola with a clock, an arcade, and a lead-roofed square dome with a weathervane.
