= Royal baccarat scandal =

British gambling scandal of the late 19th century

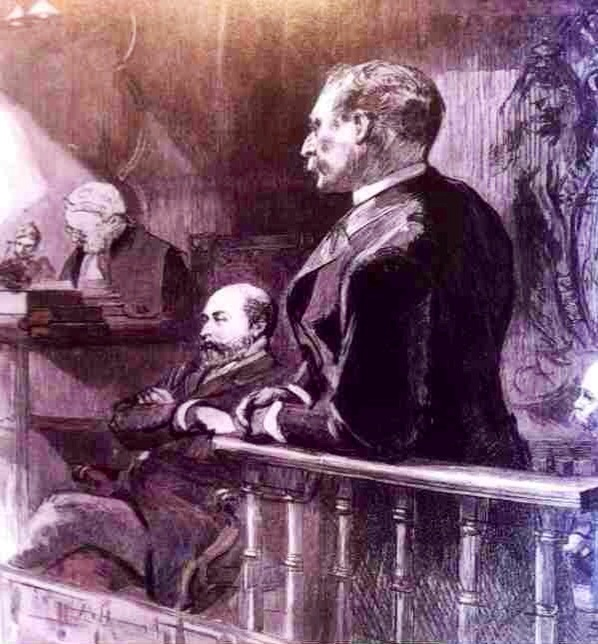
Sir William Gordon-Cumming in the witness box, in the presence of Edward, Prince of Wales, and others

The royal baccarat scandal, also known as the Tranby Croft affair, was a British gambling scandal of the late 19th century involving the Prince of Wales: the future King Edward VII. The scandal started during a house party in September 1890, when Sir William Gordon-Cumming, a lieutenant colonel in the Scots Guards, was accused of cheating at baccarat.

Edward had been invited to stay at Tranby Croft in the East Riding of Yorkshire, the home of Arthur Wilson and his family. Among Edward's party were his advisers, Lord Coventry and Lieutenant-General Owen Williams; Gordon-Cumming, a friend of the prince, was also invited. On the first night the guests played baccarat, and Wilson's son Stanley thought he saw Gordon-Cumming illegally adding to his stake. Stanley informed other members of the Wilson family, and they agreed to watch him on the following evening. Gordon-Cumming was again seen to be acting in a suspicious manner. The family members asked the advice of the royal courtiers who, with the agreement of the prince, confronted Gordon-Cumming and pressured him into signing a document that declared he would never play cards again in exchange for the silence of the guests.

The secret was not kept for long, and Gordon-Cumming demanded a retraction from the Wilson family, whom he considered to blame for divulging the news. They refused, and he filed a writ for slander in February 1891. Despite the efforts of the prince's courtiers to have the matter dealt with by a military court, the case was heard in June 1891. The atmosphere at trial was described as being like a theatre, and Edward was summoned as a witness, the first time the heir to the throne had been compelled to appear in court since 1411. Gordon-Cumming's senior counsel, the Solicitor General Sir Edward Clarke, did not persuade any of the defendants to change their stories, but he highlighted several inaccuracies and serious discrepancies in their evidence. Despite a strong and well-regarded closing speech by Clarke on Gordon-Cumming's behalf, the judge's summing up was described as biased by some and the jury found against Gordon-Cumming.

Gordon-Cumming was dismissed from the British Army the following day, and was ostracised from society for the rest of his life. A leader in The Times stated that "He has committed a mortal offence. Society can know him no more." Public opinion was on his side and the prince was at his most unpopular for several years afterwards. The affair has been of subsequent interest to writers of both fiction and non-fiction.

== Background ==
=== Sir William Gordon-Cumming ===
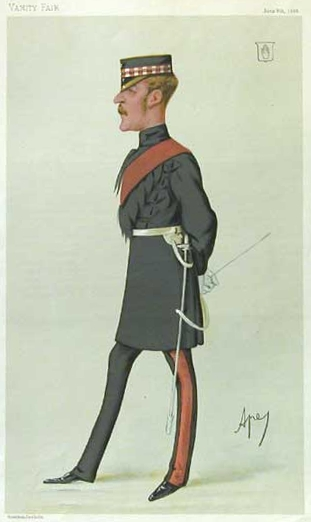
Gordon-Cumming as depicted by "Ape" in Vanity Fair, 1880

At the time of the events at the country home Tranby Croft, Yorkshire, Sir William Gordon-Cumming was a 42-year-old lieutenant colonel in the Scots Guards, having seen service in South Africa (1879), Egypt (1882) and Sudan (1884–85). (Note: His action in the Sudan was with the Guards Camel Regiment in the Desert Column.) Gordon-Cumming's biographer, Jason Tomes, thought that his subject possessed "audacity and wit [and] gloried in the sobriquet of the most arrogant man in London", while Sporting Life described him as "possibly the most handsome man in London, and certainly the rudest". In addition to considerable land holdings in Scotland, (Note: Gordon-Cumming's estates in Scotland amounted to 40,000 acres (16,000 ha; 63 sq mi); his annual income has been described as either £60,000 or £80,000 (either approximately £5,590,000 or £7,450,000 in 2014).) Gordon-Cumming owned a house in Belgravia, London; he was a friend of Edward, Prince of Wales and would lend it to the prince for assignations with royal mistresses. Gordon-Cumming was a womaniser, and stated that his aim was to "perforate" members of "the sex"; his liaisons included Lillie Langtry, Sarah Bernhardt and Lady Randolph Churchill. He was unmarried at the time of the events and subsequent court case.

=== Edward, Prince of Wales; the Marlborough House set ===
Edward, Prince of Wales, was a 49-year-old married father of five at the time he visited Tranby Croft, and had a history of association with scandals. In 1866 he had incurred the censure of his mother, Queen Victoria, when he became involved with "the fast racing set", and his betting had "harm[ed] his reputation and contribute[d] to the widespread unpopularity of the monarchy in this period", according to his biographer, Sidney Lee.

In April 1869 Sir Charles Mordaunt (1836–1897) learnt that his wife Harriet had had three separate affairs, and that her lovers included the heir to the throne. Although Mordaunt did not carry out his threat of citing the prince as co-respondent in the subsequent divorce case, Edward was subpoenaed to appear in court as a witness. Although Edward did not want to appear—and the queen wrote to the Lord Chancellor to see if this could be avoided—the law was such that the prince could be forced to appear if necessary. He appeared voluntarily and was in the witness box for seven minutes, during which time he denied having had a sexual relationship with Mordaunt's wife; he was not cross-examined. Edward's biographer, Colin Matthew, wrote that "the hearing coincided with general criticism of the very different deportments of both the queen and the prince. The latter was several times booed in public". Despite the "taboo on open criticism on [Edward's] actions, an undercurrent of dissatisfaction existed" with him and his actions. For Edward, although such affairs could be discussed between friends, scandal was to be avoided wherever possible.

In 1890 Edward gave up dancing, telling his son George that "I am getting too old and fat for these amusements"; he replaced dancing with other pursuits, like attending the opera and playing baccarat. He enjoyed baccarat so much that when he travelled he brought a set of leather counters, valued on one side from five shillings to £10 and engraved with his feathers on the other; the counters had been a present from his friend Reuben Sassoon, a member of the well-known banking family.

Surrounding Edward was a fashionable clique known as the "Marlborough House set", named after the prince's home overlooking The Mall, London. The set was a mixture of old titled families and "plutocratic and parvenu" families with fortunes from new industry, and the prince carried out an active policy to spread the social circle of the royal family to include new industrialists such as the shipping magnate Arthur Wilson.

=== Arthur Wilson and family ===
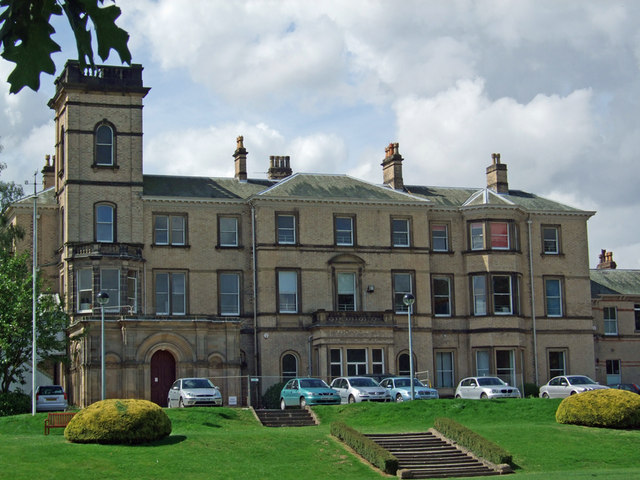
Tranby Croft, Yorkshire

Arthur Wilson was the 52-year-old Hull-based owner of a shipping business. He built his home at Tranby Croft, in the East Riding of Yorkshire, as a Victorian country house, and he and his family moved in during the summer of 1876. As well as a wife, Mary, he also had a son, (Arthur) Stanley Wilson, and a daughter, Ethel; her husband, Edward Lycett Green, was the son of the local manufacturer and MP, Sir Edward Green. Tomes reports that Gordon-Cumming may have previously propositioned Ethel Lycett Green.

=== Gambling and baccarat in 1890 ===
Baccarat is a game for up to twenty players, together with a banker and croupier; several packs of cards are used, depending on the number of players. The value of the ace to nine cards are as their pip value, while tens and court cards count as zero. A player is dealt two cards and adds up the combined pips, discounting tens and court cards, and only using the single digit value as a score – a king and a six will equal six; two eights will equal sixteen, but their value will be six. Two court cards will count as zero, or baccarat. The idea of the game is to get nine points. A player may ask for one extra card to be added to their hand. Betting is between the player and the bank, with the closest to reach nine on a hand receiving the stake.

In 1886 the High Court of Justice in London ruled in the Parks case—Jenks v. Turpin (Note: Case citation: Jenks v. Turpin (1884) 13 QBD 505. The case decided that gaming houses could be punished as being a public nuisance under common law. The relevance to the events of Tranby Croft was that the decision also stated that the actual use of the house (specifically if it were a private club) made no difference.)—that baccarat was a game of chance rather than skill, and was therefore illegal when gambling was involved. In reporting the case, The Times described baccarat as "a new game, partly of chance, at which £1,000 may be lost in 20 minutes". After a solicitor asked the Home Secretary, Henry Matthews, to clarify the position regarding baccarat in social clubs and private houses, the Home Office civil servant Godfrey Lushington stated that there was nothing in the court's judgment that made baccarat illegal if not played for money.

The former Shadow Home Secretary and historian Roy Hattersley comments that although baccarat was illegal, "worse still in the eyes of many Englishmen, [it was] thought to be popular in France".

== Visit to Tranby Croft ==
=== Preliminary events ===
In the years running up to 1890 the Prince of Wales had taken to visiting Doncaster Racecourse for the Doncaster Cup. In previous years he had stayed at Brantingham Thorpe with his friend Sir Christopher Sykes, the Conservative MP for Beverley. Sykes had run into financial difficulties and could not afford to host Edward, and Tranby Croft, home to Arthur Wilson and family, became the venue. After consulting with the prince, the Wilsons also invited some of Edward's inner circle, including Sykes, Gordon-Cumming and the prince's courtiers: the equerry Tyrwhitt Wilson, Lord Coventry, Lord Edward Somerset, Captain Arthur Somerset—his cousin—and Lieutenant-General Owen Williams, along with their wives. Also accompanying the party was Lieutenant Berkeley Levett, a brother officer to Gordon-Cumming in the Scots Guards and a friend of the Wilson family.

Among those originally invited were Lord Brooke and his wife Daisy; her step-father died two days before the party was due to leave London, and she and her husband withdrew from the trip. Daisy, the prince's mistress at the time, was known to some journalists as "babbling" Brooke because of her propensity to gossip. On 6 September Edward returned early from travelling in Europe; he visited Harriet Street where he found Daisy Brooke "in Gordon-Cumming's arms", which soured the relationship between the two men.

=== Events of 8–11 September ===
The seating plan of the left side of the table on 8 September

After dinner on 8 September, the guests at Tranby Croft listened to music from Ethel Lycett Green until about 11 pm, when the prince suggested a game of baccarat. Although the Wilsons did not have a suitably-sized table, Stanley Wilson improvised, putting two card tables alongside the smoking room table—all of which were of differing sizes—and covered them with a tapestry cloth. Among the evening's players were the prince, who acted as dealer; Sassoon, who took the part of banker; and Gordon-Cumming. Sitting next to Gordon-Cumming was Stanley Wilson, who was on Levett's left. (Note: Arthur Wilson took no part in the proceedings; the local historian Gertrude Attwood suggests that he was probably not best pleased with the suggestion of the game, as he had previously stopped his son and friends from playing a high-stakes game the previous year.)

As the game began Gordon-Cumming discussed the tapestry with Wilson, commenting that the different colours of the cloth made it difficult to see the counters; Gordon-Cumming put a piece of white paper in front of him on which to place his now highly visible stake. Although many of the inexperienced party were playing for small stakes, Gordon-Cumming was betting between £5 and £25 for a coup; he played the coup de trois system of betting, (Note: Literally "strike of three;" also known as the masse en avant ("mass to the fore") system.) in which if he won a hand with a £5 stake, he would add his winnings to the stake, together with another £5, as the stake for the next hand. Soon after play began Stanley Wilson thought he saw Gordon-Cumming add two red £5 counters onto his stake after the hand had finished, but before the stake had been paid—a method of cheating known in casinos as la poussette; after he thought that this had happened a second time, Wilson turned to Levett and, according to the later court transcripts, whispered "My God, Berkeley, this is too hot!" further explaining that "the man next to me is cheating!" After Levett also watched for a few minutes, he agreed, saying to Wilson "this is too hot". After half an hour the game was completed and the prince congratulated Gordon-Cumming on his play; the future king also asked Mrs Wilson for a more suitable table for the following day. Wilson instructed the butler to move a longer, three-foot wide table in and cover it with green baize. Stanley Wilson then discussed the cheating with Levett. The two men were uncertain what steps to take, and agreed that Stanley would ask his brother-in-law, Lycett Green, for his advice. Although Lycett Green thought it impossible that Gordon-Cumming would have cheated, Stanley told him that he was certain, as was Levett.

The following day, 9 September, the party visited the races, where the prince's horse won the Clumber Stakes. After dinner the prince once again wanted to play baccarat and asked for a chalk line to be drawn on the baize, six inches from the edge, behind which players were to keep their counters when not placing their stake. Edward was banker and Williams acted as the croupier. When Gordon-Cumming arrived at the table, there were only two vacant seats. At either of them, Gordon-Cumming would be surrounded by members of the Wilson family, all of whom had been informed of Stanley and Levett's suspicions.

The seating plan on 9 September

After half an hour's play Lycett Green once again became convinced that Gordon-Cumming was cheating. He left the table and sent a note to his mother-in-law—still at the table—recounting his suspicions: she took no action. By the time the game was finished Mary Wilson, the two Lycett Greens and Stanley Wilson—all of whom had been watching Gordon-Cumming closely—were convinced that he had been cheating, although they differed in their versions of what they saw. Others saw nothing, including people sitting closer to him, such as the prince, Lady Coventry (sitting next to Gordon-Cumming) and Levett (sitting opposite him). Over the two nights' play Gordon-Cumming won a total of £225.

Mary Wilson's brother died unexpectedly that night in Hull; although she and her husband did not attend for a second day's racing, they asked all the other guests not to interrupt the plans, and the remainder of the party attended, watching the St Leger Stakes. During the journey to the racecourse, Lycett Green asked Edward Somerset his advice, telling him that several members of the party were convinced of Gordon-Cumming's guilt. Edward Somerset decided to consult his cousin, Arthur Somerset, and the two men suggested that Lycett Green inform the prince's senior courtier, Lord Coventry. (Note: Arthur Somerset later said he was "dumbfounded" by the accusations against Gordon-Cumming, but "realised what this might mean with His Royal Highness in the house and actually taking part in the game", and considered Coventry to be the best person with whom to discuss the matter.)

Edward Lycett Green in 1891

When the party returned to Tranby Croft that evening Lycett Green, Stanley Wilson and both Somersets met Coventry; Levett refused to attend. After Lycett Green had told Coventry what he had seen, the latter summoned Williams, who was a mutual friend of both the prince and Gordon-Cumming. Lycett Green repeated the allegation once again. Williams later recounted that he was "shocked and overwhelmed with a sense of calamity", and said that the prince must be informed immediately. There was some disagreement between the courtiers on whether to tell the prince; Coventry and Wilson both thought it the right move, but Arthur Somerset felt that the matter could and should be dealt with by those present. Later he was persuaded that informing the prince was the right course of action. Lycett Green grew more pugnacious throughout the discussions, and threatened to accuse Gordon-Cumming in public at the races the following day; he also stated that "I will not be a party to letting Gordon-Cumming prey on society in future". (Note: Edward's biographer, Jane Ridley; and the former Lord Chancellor, Michael Havers, the lawyer Edward Grayson and the historian Peter Shankland, draw similar conclusions to the cause of Lycett Green's statement: that it was less connected to the act of cheating, but owed more to Gordon-Cumming's reputation as a womaniser, possibly including the propositioning of Lycett Green's wife.) The men decided that Gordon-Cumming should sign a document admitting his guilt in exchange for their silence, and Williams and Coventry went to Edward to inform him of what had been happening. The two men told the prince that "the evidence they had heard was absolutely conclusive and they did not believe Sir William Gordon-Cumming had a leg to stand on".

The prince believed what he had been told by his courtiers, and also assumed that cheating had taken place; he later said that with accusations from five witnesses he believed the worst of his friend straight away. At no point had any of those concerned investigated the situation more closely, by asking others present or seeking out Gordon-Cumming's side of events, but they had believed the events as told to them by Lycett Green and Stanley Wilson. After informing the prince, the two courtiers sought out the accused man and informed him of what had been said. Coventry broke the news to him, saying that "There is a very disagreeable thing that has occurred in this house. Some of the people staying here object ... to the way you play baccarat", and that the accusation was that he had "resorted to foul play" at the game. Gordon-Cumming denied the accusation, asking "Do you believe the statements of a parcel of inexperienced boys?", and demanded to see the prince.

After dinner the guests signed the visitors book, after which the prince—accompanied by Coventry, Williams and the two Somersets—received Lycett Green and the other accusers. After hearing what they had to say, the prince dismissed all except Coventry and Williams, and called for Gordon-Cumming, who told Edward that the accusation was "foul and abominable"; the prince pointed out that "there are five accusers against you". Gordon-Cumming then withdrew while the royal party discussed what the next steps would be. He returned after half an hour to find just the two courtiers, who urged him to sign a document that they had drafted. Under pressure, and still denying the accusations, Gordon-Cumming signed the document without knowing who else would sign it afterwards.

"In consideration of the promise made by the gentlemen whose names are subscribed to preserve my silence with reference to an accusation which has been made in regard to my conduct at baccarat on the nights of Monday and Tuesday the 8th and 9th at Tranby Croft, I will on my part solemnly undertake never to play cards again as long as I live."

— (Signed) W. Gordon-Cumming

The courtiers took the document to Edward, who summoned the other members of the house; he read the note to them and signed it, pointing out to everyone that the promise of secrecy was incumbent on all of them. He also added that Gordon-Cumming was still protesting his innocence, despite signing a paper that "practically admitted his guilt". The paper was then signed by the men present: the prince, Coventry, Williams, Wilson and his son, both Somersets, Lycett Green, Levett and Sassoon. (Note: Ridley points out that the only guest who did not sign the paper, and who was also not called as a witness was Sykes, whose name was not raised at any point in the proceedings.) (Note: Queen Victoria later wrote "The incredible and shameful thing is that others dragged ... [the prince] into it and urged him to sign this paper, which of course he should never have done".) Although the prince hoped that this would bring an end to the affair, Arthur Somerset pointed out that it would not remain secret. Edward asked him "not even when gentlemen have given their word not to divulge it?"; Somerset replied that "It is impossible, sir. Nothing in the world known to ten people was ever kept secret".

On the advice of Williams, Gordon-Cumming left Tranby Croft early the following morning, 11 September; he left behind a letter to Mary Wilson apologising for his early departure, and one for Williams, again stating his innocence, but acknowledging that "it is essential to avoid an open row and the scandal arising therefrom."

== Developments: the path to the High Court ==
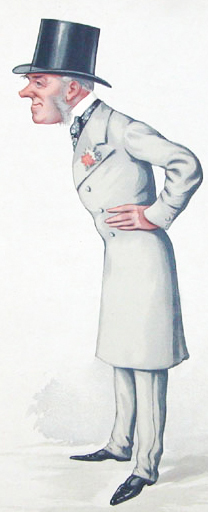
Lord Coventry, adviser to the prince at Tranby Croft

Once he was back in London Gordon-Cumming received a response to the letter he had written to Williams. Signed by the prince, Coventry and Williams, the note advised him that "you must clearly understand that in the face of the overwhelming evidence against you, it is useless to attempt to deny the accusations". Gordon-Cumming wrote to Edward with a "final appeal to show how utterly it remains in your power to utterly damn, morally and physically, one who has ever been a loyal and devoted subject"; it went unanswered by prince and courtiers.

Instead of hunting big game abroad as he usually did over the winter months, Gordon-Cumming spent time in London and at his Scottish estate. He was also seen in the presence of an American heiress, Florence Garner, and the two became engaged. On 27 December he received an anonymous message from Paris that read: "they are beginning to talk much here of ... your sad adventure ... They have talked too much in England". (Note: The message was in French and was sent from 4 rue de la Concorde, Paris, the address of a club to which Gordon-Cumming belonged.) He sent the message to Williams and asked him to let the prince know the contents.

A fortnight later Gordon-Cumming was informed by a lady acquaintance that the events at Tranby Croft were being discussed in London society; (Note: The American press openly speculated that the source of the gossip was Edward's mistress, Lady Brooke. In February 1911 Brooke wrote to The Times to deny that this was the case.) he again wrote to Williams to inform him of developments and received an unsatisfactory response. Gordon-Cumming then sent a telegram to the prince asking to meet and informing him that "information I have recently received to the effect that the whole story is the subject of comment at the Turf Club ... the promise of secrecy made has been broken by those concerned". Although Edward acknowledged receipt of the message, he declined to meet. After the negative response from the prince, Gordon-Cumming lost patience and decided to fight the situation. He released his fiancée from their engagement and then visited his solicitors, Wontner & Sons. Wontners had some knowledge of the law surrounding baccarat, as they had previously been involved in the Jenks v. Turpin case.

On the advice of his solicitors Gordon-Cumming obtained a written summary of events from Coventry and Williams, and informed his commanding officer, Colonel Stacey, of the situation. Stacey told Gordon-Cumming that, according to Article 41 of the Queen's Regulations, he should already have reported the matter. Gordon-Cumming replied that because the prince had been involved, and because all present had been sworn to secrecy, he had been unable to fulfil the requirement of the Regulations. He then "placed his commission in Stacey's hands pending the result of ... [the] action".

As the matter involved the prince, Stacey consulted other officers in the regiment about what should be done, and found that opinion was divided between allowing Gordon-Cumming to remain in the regiment while he defended himself or removing him straight away. The Colonel of the Scots Guards, the prince's younger brother, the Duke of Connaught, was also asked: according to Havers, Grayson and Shankland, the duke "insisted that Gordon-Cumming must be crushed". Stacey disagreed, and thought that the whole story needed to be brought out before such a decision was taken. He reported the situation to the Adjutant-General to the Forces, General Sir Redvers Buller, and requested permission to let Gordon-Cumming retire on half-pay. Buller agreed to the request, but stated that if Gordon-Cumming's legal action failed, the permission would be reviewed. Stacey relayed the message to Gordon-Cumming and told him that signing the note was an error: "Because you signed that document you will never put on a sword in the regiment. If you bring a successful action you will be allowed to retire: if you fail, you will be dismissed [from] the service". The Duke of Connaught strongly disapproved of Buller's decision and withdrew to Portsmouth, refusing to again be drawn on the affair, even after his brother requested further advice. (Note: The duke later wrote that "no one feels stronger against Sir G Cumming than I do, but as colonel of the regiment I have felt all along that I must be perfectly fair and impartial ... Being the Prince's brother it was more than ever incumbent on me not to allow myself to be used in a manner that might cause the world to think that Cumming was to be sacrificed to save annoyance to the Prince".)

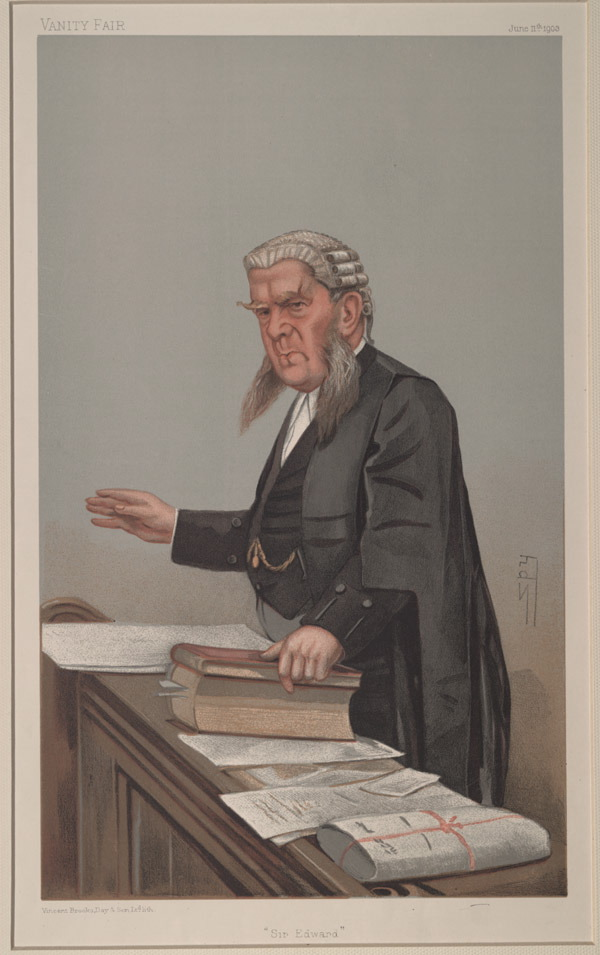
Gordon-Cumming's senior counsel, the Solicitor General, Sir Edward Clarke, c. 1911

On 27 January Gordon-Cumming made a final attempt to have the rumours scotched by instructing his solicitors to write to the two Lycett Greens, Stanley Wilson, Levett and Mary Wilson, to demand retraction of the accusation or face a writ for slander. On 6 February, with no withdrawal forthcoming, Gordon-Cumming issued writs against the five, claiming £5,000 against each of them. (Note: £5,000 is approximately £460,000 in 2014.)

On receipt of the writ the Wilsons consulted their solicitor George Lewis, who had also acted for the prince on previous occasions. Lewis briefed Sir Charles Russell to act as counsel for the defence, assisted by H. H. Asquith, the future Liberal prime minister. Wontner & Sons approached the Solicitor General, Sir Edward Clarke, to act as counsel on Gordon-Cumming's behalf. One of Lewis's early concerns was to ensure Edward did not appear in court. If Gordon-Cumming could be found guilty by a military tribunal, then the rationale for a court case would disappear. Lewis asked Coventry and Williams to raise the matter again with Buller, who rejected their entreaties. Buller explained his decision in a letter to the queen's secretary, Sir Henry Ponsonby, writing that "I absolutely declined to take action against ... [Gordon-Cumming] upon street rumours".

After Buller received a letter from Wontners confirming that civil action was taking place, he consulted the Judge Advocate General, who informed him that no military enquiry should take place while such a case was proceeding. Lewis then tried to persuade the Guards' Club, of which Gordon-Cumming was a member, to carry out an enquiry into the events, which would have negated much of the need for a trial. A vote of the members rejected the possibility, and the civil trial remained the outcome. The prince was furious with the Guards, and wrote to Ponsonby that "The decision of the Guards Club is a terrible blow to the Scots Guards; and I feel most deeply for the officers who have the honour of their regiment so much at heart."

Journalists drew their own conclusions from the manoeuvrings by the prince and his entourage, with the radical press quick to attack the attempts to avoid the scrutiny of a civil court. The Echo wrote that "The Baccarat Scandal is to be hushed up ... It is, no doubt, a very comfortable arrangement for all parties concerned", while even The New York Times, normally sympathetic to Edward, foresaw political problems if the trial was prejudiced by such actions.

After it was decided the case would be heard by the Lord Chief Justice, Lord Coleridge, his court at the Royal Courts of Justice, London, was converted to accommodate the case, raising the height of the bench and witness box, and installing new seating. In May it was announced that the case would start on 1 June, and that entry to the court would be by ticket only.

== Trial ==
Gordon-Cumming in the witness box, as seen by the satirical magazine Punch

The trial opened on 1 June 1891. Ticket holders began queuing at 9:30 am, and the court was full half an hour before its 11 am start time. The prince sat on a red leather chair on a raised platform between the judge and the witness box; his appearance was the first time since 1411 that an heir to the throne had appeared involuntarily in court. (Note: In 1411 it was Prince Henry who was committed for contempt of court by Judge William Gascoigne.) The Pall Mall Gazette stated that "the court presented an appearance which, save for the dignity of its own fittings and its rows of learned-looking law books, might have been taken for a theatre at a fashionable matinée", with society ladies watching proceedings with opera glasses or lorgnettes. (Note: The journalist William Teignmouth Shore, who edited an account of the trial in the 1920s, agreed, and wrote that the court was "turned by consent of the judge into a theatre, and a shoddy theatre at that". Clarke also considered the proceedings to resemble a theatre and wrote that when Coleridge ordered "'Silence, this is not a theatre,' [it] sounded in the circumstances rather amusing".) The correspondent of The Manchester Guardian described the opening of the case as being "in the presence of a carefully selected and fashionable assembly", while Clarke later wrote that "the court had a strange appearance. Lord Coleridge had appropriated half of the public gallery, and had given tickets to his friends".

Clarke opened the case for the plaintiff, telling the jury that "It is a simple question, aye or no, did Sir William Gordon-Cumming cheat at cards?" After describing Gordon-Cumming's background and record, he explained the rules of baccarat, which he described as "the most unintelligent mode of losing your own money, or getting somebody else's, I ever heard of". Clarke also outlined Gordon-Cumming's coup de trois system of placing bets which, he explained, could have been mistaken by the inexperienced players as cheating, rather than a correct method of gambling. After his opening speech, Clarke then questioned Gordon-Cumming and his approach was to show that Gordon-Cumming "was a man of honour who had been sacrificed to save the courtiers".

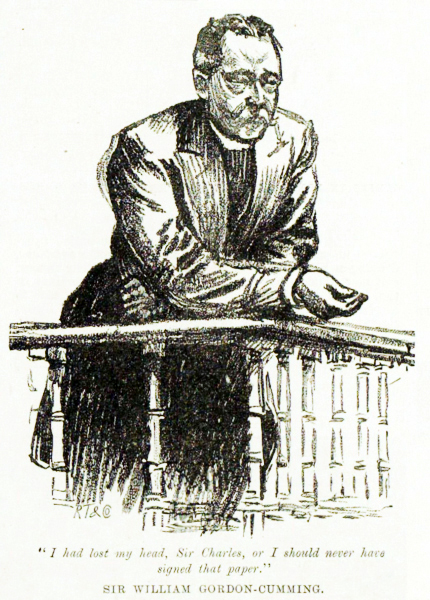
Sir William Gordon-Cumming and Edward, Prince of Wales in court

After an adjournment for lunch Gordon-Cumming returned to the witness box, where he was cross-examined by Russell. During the session Russell provided a model of the table used and a photograph of the room, and questioned Gordon-Cumming about the bets where cheating had been suspected. Russell also asked him about why he had signed the document agreeing not to play cards: Gordon-Cumming stated that he had "lost my head ... on that occasion. If I had not lost my head I would not have signed that document". Gordon-Cumming's cross-examination ran into the second day, after which he was then re-examined by Clarke; his time in the witness box lasted until 1 pm. The Illustrated London News considered that "Gordon-Cumming made an admirable witness ... leaning easily on the rail, his grey-gloved left hand resting easily on the bare right, perfectly dressed, his tones equable, firm, neither over-hurried nor over-deliberate, cool, but not too cool".

Gordon-Cumming was replaced in the witness box by the prince. Examined by Clarke, he stated that he had not seen any cheating and was ignorant of the accusations until he was told by Coventry and Williams. After twenty minutes of questions from both Clarke and Russell, the prince was free to depart. As the prince was leaving the witness box, a member of the jury put two questions to Edward: whether the heir had seen "nothing of the alleged malpractices of the plaintiff?" and "What was your Royal Highness's opinion at the time as to the charges made against Sir William Gordon-Cumming?" To the first question the prince replied that he had not, although he explained that "it is not usual for a banker to see anything in dealing cards"; to the second, he stated that "the charges appeared to be so unanimous that it was the proper course—no other course was open to me—than to believe them". In comparison with Gordon-Cumming's performance in the witness box, Edward did not make a strong impression; the reporter for The New York Times noticed "that the heir apparent was decidedly fidgety, that he kept changing his position, and that he did not seem able to keep his hands still ... Except to those near him, only two or three of his answers were fairly audible throughout the courtroom". The Daily News agreed, and stated that the impression gained from the prince's performance was unfavourable.

The court adjourned for lunch after Edward's examination, after which Clarke called his last witness, Williams. Under Clarke's questioning Williams confirmed that he had seen no actions by Gordon-Cumming that he considered as unfair. After Clarke finished questioning Williams, Asquith cross-examined the soldier for the remainder of the session; after a brief re-examination by Clarke, the day—and the case for the plaintiff—came to an end. The third day began with the opening speech for the defendants, after which Stanley Wilson took the stand for the remainder of the day, and on into the fourth day. Examined by Asquith, Stanley recounted seeing Gordon-Cumming illicitly add counters to his stake twice on the first night and at least twice on the second night, although he could not remember the full details. When cross-examined by Clarke he was not brow-beaten by the lawyer's questions, although Clarke made him appear "brash, conceited and callow". Stanley was replaced in the witness box by Levett; The Morning Advertiser considered that Levett "felt somewhat uncomfortable" appearing against Gordon-Cumming, and reported that he had "described his position as an 'awkward' one". Despite his discomfort, Levett confirmed that on the first evening he had seen Gordon-Cumming add counters after the hand had finished but before the stake had been paid. He was unsure of other details of the evening's play, and had not witnessed anything on the second night.

Edward Lycett Green, described by Havers, Grayson and Shankland as "the emotional force behind the accusations", was next in the witness box. Although he had not played on the first night, Clarke considered Lycett Green a potentially dangerous witness, as he may have held vital evidence. Lycett Green stated that he had seen Gordon-Cumming twice push counters over the chalk line when he should not have done so; he had considered accusing Gordon-Cumming at the time, but decided against it because he "did not like to make a scene before ladies". At points in the examination by Asquith, Lycett Green contradicted the course of events outlined by Stanley Wilson—which Levett had also done—and on one point regarding a question the prince put to Levett; his answer was "highly suspect". Havers, Grayson and Shankland later wrote that "it is remarkable that he, the prime mover in the affair, seemed unable to say anything without qualifying it with some such remark as, 'I don't exactly remember' ... The hedging by the principal accuser certainly weakens the defendants' case". They also thought that "[h]is refusal to remember anything was obviously humbug, a deliberate policy".

Lycett Green was followed into the witness box by his wife, and her testimony ran into the following day. Under questioning she confirmed that she had seldom played baccarat before; although she had seen nothing untoward on the first night, she accepted her husband's second-hand version of events as the truth, but did not agree that as a result she had been watching Gordon-Cumming. Although she "gave the most important part of her evidence with clarity and conviction", and had impressed the public and press, according to Havers, Grayson and Shankland, she provided a different series of events to those outlined by other witnesses, although she stated that she thought she had seen Gordon-Cumming illicitly add to his stake.

After Mrs Lycett Green had finished her testimony on the fifth day, her place was taken by Mrs Wilson. On examination by Russell, Mrs Wilson stated that she thought she saw Gordon-Cumming cheat twice by adding additional counters to his stake. When Clarke cross-examined her, he asked if anyone had placed a stake of £15. Mrs Wilson stated that only her husband had placed such an amount, but Wilson had not played on either night as he disliked both the game and high-stakes gambling. Havers, Grayson and Shankland consider it "rather shocking really, considering that she had sworn to tell the truth, ... to find her coming out with this ... lie spoken, apparently, with the complete self-assurance that the other members of her family had shown".

The final witness called for the defence was Coventry. He was one of the non-playing members of the party who had witnessed no cheating, understood little about gambling and, as a non-soldier, knew nothing of Article 41 of the Queen's Regulations. When cross-examined by Clarke, Coventry confirmed that as far as he was aware, the witnesses had all decided to watch Gordon-Cumming's play on the second night, despite their claims to the contrary.

From the muddled and conflicting statements given in evidence, and in the documentary record of the shameful, and we hold criminal, compact which they made with Sir William Gordon-Cumming, we confess our inability to construct a clear coherent story.

— Daily Chronicle, June 1891

As the defence closed, the Daily Chronicle considered "the obvious doubts which tainted the accusations of the defendants ... they and the Prince's flunkeys all contradicted each other on material points". Russell's summing up for the defence took the remainder of the day and the court adjourned until the following Monday, when he continued. He referred to a possible thirteen acts of cheating that the defendants were alleged to have seen, and that "we have five persons who believe he cheated, swearing unmistakably they saw him cheat, and telling you how they saw him cheat".

Once Russell had completed his speech for the defendants, Clarke gave his reply, which the Daily Chronicle considered to be "a very brilliant, powerful, wily and courageous effort". Clarke pointed to the many inaccuracies in both the written statement prepared by Coventry and Williams, and in the memories of all concerned. He went on to outline that there had been celebrations at the races—the prince's horse had won on the first day, and the St Leger had been run on the second—combined with the full hospitality of the Wilsons to consider: according to the court reporter for The Times, Clarke "alluded to the profuse hospitalities of Tranby Croft, not with any idea of suggesting drunkenness, but as indicating that the guests might not be in a state for accurate observation". He also drew the jury's attention to the gaps in the defendants' memories, where they were so precise about some of their observations, but could not remember other, key, details. Clarke lampooned some of the involved parties, referring to Lycett Green as "a Master of Hounds who hunts four days a week", while Stanley Wilson was a spoiled wastrel from a rich family who lacked initiative and drive. Above all, Clarke indicated, the defendants—with the exception of Stanley Wilson—saw what they had been told to expect: "the eye saw what it expected or sought to see ... there was only one witness who saw Sir William Gordon-Cumming cheat without expecting it—young Mr. [Stanley] Wilson. The others were all told there had been cheating, and expected to see it". At the end of his reply, Clarke's speech was greeted by applause amongst those in the galleries. The British lawyer Heber Hart later wrote that Clarke's speech was "probably the most conspicuous example of the moral courage and independence of the Bar that has occurred in modern times", while Clarke considered it to be "one of the best speeches I ever made." (Note: The prince thought Clarke's speech was "spiteful", and his private secretary, Sir Francis Knollys, wrote to Sir Schomberg McDonnell, the Prime Minister's secretary, suggesting that the Cabinet "ought to have taken steps to have protect [the prince] from the public insults of one of the law officers of the crown." McDonnell replied that it would be a dangerous step, and no action was taken against the Solicitor General. Clarke lost his position of Solicitor General when Lord Salisbury's government resigned in 1892, but when the Conservatives returned to office in 1895, Salisbury again offered the post to Clarke, who declined the opportunity.)

Coleridge exercised all his ingenuity to sway the jury against ... [Gordon-Cumming], answering and belittling Clarke's case point by point, and echoing Russell's words in a milder but more deadly form exactly as if he too were working from Mr George Lewis's brief ... it is the duty of the judge not to incline to either side: he must remain upright, hold the balance even, and put the case for both sides fairly to the jury. This Coleridge most certainly did not do.

— Havers, Grayson and Shankland

The following day, 9 June, Coleridge began his four-hour summing up. His summary was a response to Clarke's, and he went through on a point-by-point basis to discredit the solicitor general's speech, although in places his description "was directly contrary to the evidence". Tomes relates that "many opined that the judge's summing-up had been unacceptably biased"; Havers, Grayson and Shankland call Coleridge's speech "biased", while The National Observer considered it "a melancholy and flagrant violation of the best traditions of the English bench." Some sections of the press, however, were more sympathetic; The Pall Mall Gazette thought the summing up to be justified, while The Daily Telegraph thought Coleridge's summary to have been "nobly comprehensive and eloquent ... he fulfilled his duty perfectly, displaying nothing but impartial desire for the truth".

The jury deliberated for only thirteen minutes before finding in favour of the defendants; their decision was greeted by prolonged hissing from some members of the galleries. According to the historian Christopher Hibbert "the demonstrations in court were an accurate reflection of the feelings of the people outside". The historian Philip Magnus-Allcroft later wrote that "a storm of obloquy broke over the head of the Prince of Wales. It would be difficult to exaggerate the momentary unpopularity of the Prince", and he was booed at Ascot that month.

== Aftermath ==
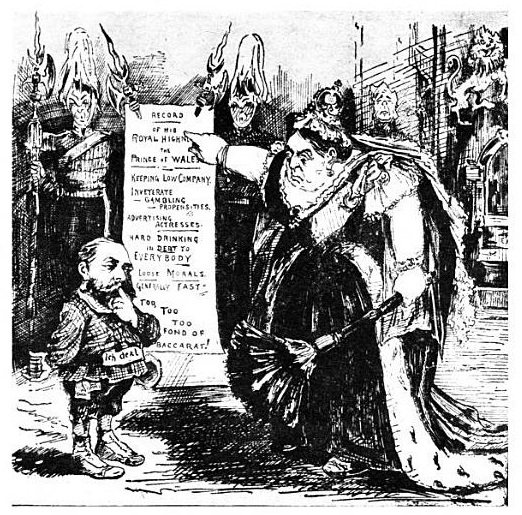
L'enfant terrible: Victoria shows the prince the list of his misdemeanours; a caricature from Puck, June 1891.

Gordon-Cumming was dismissed from the British Army on 10 June 1891, the day after the case closed, and he resigned his membership of his four London clubs: the Carlton, Guards', Marlborough and Turf. Although he offered to break his engagement for a second time, he married his American heiress fiancée the same day; she had stood by him throughout the scandal and the couple went on to have five children together. He retired to his Scottish estate and his property in Dawlish, Devon. He never re-entered society and the prince "declined to meet anyone who henceforth acknowledged the Scottish baronet". The leader in The Times stated that "He is ... condemned by the verdict of the jury to social extinction. His brilliant record is wiped out and he must, so to speak, begin life again. Such is the inexorable social rule ... He has committed a mortal offence. Society can know him no more." (Note: After Gordon-Cumming's death in 1930, his house at Gordonstoun was obtained by Kurt Hahn, who turned it into the eponymous school. It has been attended by Prince Philip, Duke of Edinburgh, and his three sons, Charles, Andrew and Edward.) None of Gordon-Cumming's close friends spoke to him again, although some relented after Edward's death in 1910; (Note: The prince became Edward VII, having succeeded his mother on her death in January 1901.) Gordon-Cumming remained bitter about the events until his death in 1930. Clarke retained his faith in his client and, in his 1918 memoirs, wrote that "I believe the verdict was wrong, and that Sir William Gordon-Cumming was innocent".

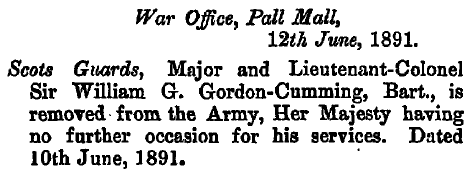
Gordon-Cumming's dismissal notice in The London Gazette, June 1891

Following the trial the prince changed his behaviour to some extent, and although he continued to gamble, he did so in a more discreet manner; he stopped playing baccarat altogether, taking up whist instead. While he was unpopular at the end of the case, Ridley considers that the matter "probably did little serious damage to ... [the prince's] standing"; Havers, Grayson and Shankland agree, and write that by 1896, when the prince's horse Persimmon won the Epsom Derby, the prince "had never been more popular". Matthew observes that it was only when one of the prince's own circle of confidantes brought him to court that the newspapers would "seriously harr[y] him ... the British in the 1890s had no general wish to see their future monarch fail".

The scandal and court case have been the subject of factual and fictional publications. Most biographies of Edward VII contain some details of the scandal, but the first book to cover it in detail did not appear until 1932. This was Teignmouth Shore's The Baccarat Case, published in the Notable British Trials series and incorporating a full transcript of the case. In 1977 Havers, Grayson and Shankland wrote The Royal Baccarat Scandal, which was subsequently dramatised in a play of the same name by Royce Ryton; the play was first produced at the Chichester Festival Theatre. Ryton's work was also broadcast in December 1991 as a two-hour drama on BBC Radio 4. In 2017 Royal Betrayal was published, written by the former British Army officer Michael Scott. In 2000 George MacDonald Fraser placed his fictional antihero, Harry Flashman, into the scandal in the short story "The Subtleties of Baccarat", one of the three stories in Flashman and the Tiger. The Anglicist Andrew Glazzard has suggested that the affair may have been alluded to in Arthur Conan Doyle's Sherlock Holmes story The Adventure of the Empty House.

== Notes and references ==
=== Sources ===
- Attwood, Gertrude (1988). The Wilsons of Tranby Croft. London: Hutton Press. ISBN 978-0-907033-71-4.
- Clarke, Sir Edward (1918). The Story of my Life. London: Penguin Books.
- Diamond, Michael (2004). Victorian Sensation. London: Anthem Press. ISBN 978-1-84331-150-8.
- Dixon, David (1991). From Prohibition to Regulation: Bookmaking, Anti-Gambling, and the Law. Oxford: Clarendon Press. ISBN 978-0-19-825616-8.
- Hart, Heber L. (1939). Reminiscences & Reflections. London: The Bodley Head. OCLC 5274958.
- Hattersley, Roy (2004). The Edwardians: Biography of the Edwardian Age. London: Little, Brown & Company. ISBN 978-0-316-72537-8.
- Havers, Michael; Grayson, Edward; Shankland, Peter (1988). The Royal Baccarat Scandal. London: Souvenir Press Ltd. ISBN 978-0-285-62852-6.
- Hibbert, Christopher (2007). Edward VII: The Last Victorian King. London: Palgrave Macmillan. ISBN 978-1-4039-8377-0.
- Hoyle, Edmond; Dawson, Lawrence Hawkins (1994) [1950]. The Complete Hoyle's Games. Ware, Hertfordshire: Wordsworth Editions. ISBN 978-1-85326-316-3.
- Lee, Sidney (1925). King Edward VII: A Biography – Volume 1. New York: Macmillan.
- Macnaghten, M. M.; Matthew, H. C. G. (2004). "Clarke, Sir Edward George (1841–1931)". Oxford Dictionary of National Biography. Oxford University Press. doi:10.1093/ref:odnb/32426. (subscription, Wikipedia Library access or UK public library membership required)
- Magnus-Allcroft, Philip (1975). King Edward the Seventh. London: Penguin Books. ISBN 978-0-14-002658-0.
- Matthew, H.C.G. (2004). "Edward VII (1841–1910)". Oxford Dictionary of National Biography. Oxford University Press. doi:10.1093/ref:odnb/32975. (subscription, Wikipedia Library access or UK public library membership required)
- McHugh, Michael (2008). "The Rise (and Fall?) of the Barrister Class". In Gleeson, Justin; Higgins, Ruth (eds.). Rediscovering Rhetoric: Law, Language, and the Practice of Persuasion. Annandale, NSW: Federation Press. ISBN 978-1-86287-705-4.
- Miers, David (2004). Regulating Commercial Gambling: Past, Present and Future. Oxford: Oxford University Press. ISBN 978-0-19-825672-4.
- Ridley, Jane (2004). "Marlborough House Set (act. 1870s–1901)". Oxford Dictionary of National Biography. Oxford University Press. (subscription, Wikipedia Library access or UK public library membership required)
- Ridley, Jane (2012). Bertie: A Life of Edward VII. London: Chatto & Windus. ISBN 978-0-7011-7614-3.
- Teignmouth Shore, W., ed. (2006) [1932]. The Baccarat Case. London: Butterworth & Co. ISBN 978-1-84664-787-1.
- Tomes, Jason (2010). "Cumming, Sir William Gordon Gordon-, fourth baronet (1848–1930)". Oxford Dictionary of National Biography. Oxford University Press. doi:10.1093/ref:odnb/39392. (subscription, Wikipedia Library access or UK public library membership required)
- Tremeear, W. J. (1900). Canadian Criminal Cases Annotated. Vol. 1. Canada Law Journal Company.
