= Sir William Gordon-Cumming, 4th Baronet =

Scottish socialite and soldier (1848–1930)

Sir William Gordon-Cumming
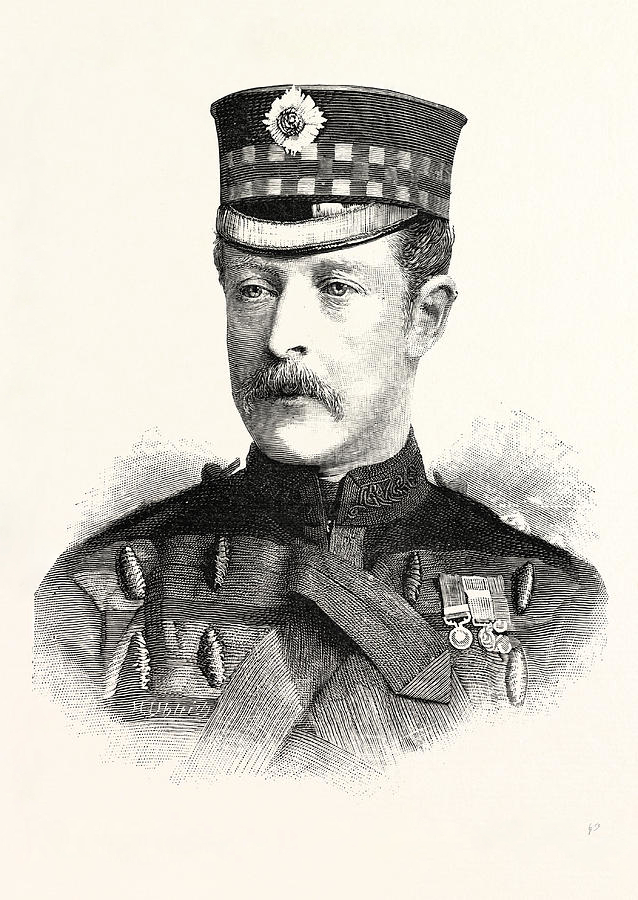
- Gordon-Cumming in 1891
- Born: 20 July 1848; Forres, Morayshire, Scotland
- Died: 20 May 1930 (aged 81); Forres, Morayshire
- Spouse: Florence Garner (m. 1891)
- Military career
- Branch: British Army
- Service years: 1868–1891
- Rank: Lieutenant-Colonel
- Unit: Scots Guards
- Conflicts: Anglo-Zulu War (1879); Anglo-Egyptian War (1882) Mahdist War (1884–1885)

Sir William Alexander Gordon Gordon-Cumming, 4th Baronet (20 July 1848 – 20 May 1930), was a Scottish landowner, soldier, socialite and a notorious womaniser. He was the central figure in the royal baccarat scandal of 1891. After inheriting a baronetcy he joined the British Army in 1868 and saw service in South Africa, Egypt and the Sudan; he served with distinction for two decades and rose to the rank of lieutenant-colonel. Something of an adventurer, he also spent time hunting in the US and India.

A friend of Edward, Prince of Wales, for over 20 years, in 1890 he attended a house party at Tranby Croft in the East Riding of Yorkshire, where he took part in a game of baccarat at the behest of the prince. During the course of two nights' play he was accused of cheating, which he denied vehemently. After news of the affair leaked out, he sued five members of the party for slander; the Prince of Wales was called as a witness. The case was a public spectacle, widely reported in the UK and abroad, but the verdict went against Gordon-Cumming and he was ostracised from polite society.

A handsome, arrogant man, Gordon-Cumming was a philanderer, particularly with married women. In 1891, after the court case, he married Florence Garner, an American heiress; the couple had five children, but their relationship was unhappy. He was the grandfather of the writers Katie Fforde and Jane Gordon-Cumming.

== Early life ==
William Gordon Gordon-Cumming was born on 20 July 1848 at Sanquhar House, near Forres, Morayshire. His parents were Alexander Penrose Gordon-Cumming—the third of the Gordon-Cumming baronets—and Anne Pitcairn (née Campbell). William was the second of the couple's four children and their eldest son. His uncle, Roualeyn George Gordon-Cumming, was a noted big-game hunter; and his aunt, Constance Gordon-Cumming, was a travel writer. Gordon-Cumming was educated at the English boarding schools Eton and Wellington colleges.

At the age of eighteen he inherited the baronetcy and became chief of Clan Cumming; his line had been traced from the fourth century, through Charlemagne. His inheritance included three Morayshire estates: Altyre near Forres, Gordonstoun near Elgin, and the village of Dallas. The estates totalled 38,500 acres (156 km^{2}) of poor quality land; the annual income from the estates in around 1890 has been given as either £60,000 or £80,000. (Note: According to calculations based on the Consumer Price Index measure of inflation, £60,000 in 1890 is the approximate equivalent to £6,670,000 in 2025, while £80,000 the same year is equivalent to £8,890,000 in 2025.)

== Military career ==
Although Gordon-Cumming had asthma and was blind in one eye, he purchased a commission as ensign in the Scots Fusilier Guards (renamed in 1877 as the Scots Guards) in 1868 (dated from 25 December 1867). He was promoted to regimental lieutenant and to the brevet rank of captain in the army by purchase on 17 May 1871, the last year in which commissions were available for purchase. (Note: Officers in the foot guards regiments held substantive regimental ranks and a higher army brevet rank.) He volunteered for service in South Africa in the Anglo-Zulu War, where he served gallantly and was mentioned in despatches; he was the first man to enter Cetshwayo's kraal after the Battle of Ulundi (1879). That year he conveyed the condolences of the army to the ex-Empress Eugénie on the death of her son, Napoléon, Prince Imperial.

Gordon-Cumming was promoted to the regimental rank of captain and the army rank of lieutenant-colonel on 28 July 1880. He served in Egypt during the Anglo-Egyptian War (1882) and in the Sudan in the Mahdist War (1884–1885), the last of which was with the Guards Camel Regiment in the Desert Column. (Note: The Desert Column was part of the Nile Expedition to relieve Major-General Charles George Gordon at Khartoum, Sudan, during the Mahdist War.) He was promoted to the regimental rank of major on 23 May 1888.

He also found time for independent travel and adventure, stalking tigers on foot in India and hunting in the Rocky Mountains in the US; in 1871 he published an account of his travels in India, Wild Men and Wild Beasts: Scenes in Camp and Jungle. The work covers the best routes to travel to and from India and which animals are available for hunting in which season, as well as the equipment a hunter would need to take on an expedition. He concluded his work with the following:

The record of my doings might no doubt have been more acceptable to the general reader had it been more varied with matter other than mere slaughter, and had the tale of bloodshed been more frequently relieved by accounts of the geography, scenery, and natural history, human and bestial, of the country; but all these have been well described elsewhere, and by abler pens.

== Royal baccarat scandal ==
In September 1890 Arthur Wilson, the 52-year-old Hull-based owner of a shipping business, invited Gordon-Cumming, along with Edward, Prince of Wales, to a house party at Tranby Croft in the East Riding of Yorkshire; Gordon-Cumming and the prince had been friends for over twenty years. Among the other people present that weekend were Wilson's wife, Mary, their son, Stanley, their daughter, Ethel, and her husband, Edward Lycett Green, who was the son of Sir Edward Green, 1st Baronet, a local Conservative politician. Several members of the prince's inner circle were also invited to stay, including Christopher Sykes—the Conservative MP for Beverley—the equerry Tyrwhitt Wilson, Lord Coventry, Lord Edward Somerset, his cousin Captain Arthur Somerset, and Lieutenant-General Owen Williams, along with their wives. Also accompanying the party was Lieutenant Berkeley Levett, a brother officer to Gordon-Cumming in the Scots Guards and a friend of the Wilson family.

During the evenings of the weekend, Edward insisted on playing baccarat, a game that was at the time illegal if gambling was involved; many of the house joined in, including Gordon-Cumming, Levett and Stanley Wilson. The prince acted as the dealer. (Note: Edward was such a fan of baccarat that when he travelled he took a set of leather counters, valued on one side from five shillings to £10 and engraved with his feathers on the other; the counters had been a present from his friend Reuben Sassoon, a member of the well-known banking family.) On the first night of play, Stanley Wilson thought he saw Gordon-Cumming add two red £5 counters onto his stake after the hand had finished, but before the winnings had been paid, thus increasing the money paid to him by the bank—a method of cheating known in casinos as la poussette. He alerted Levett, sitting next to him, and both men thought they saw Gordon-Cumming repeat the act on the next hand.

After the second evening of play Lycett Green, Stanley Wilson and Arthur and Edward Somerset confronted Gordon-Cumming and accused him of cheating. (Note: Edward's biographer, Jane Ridley; and the former Lord Chancellor, Michael Havers, the lawyer Edward Grayson and the historian Peter Shankland, draw similar conclusions to the cause of Lycett Green's statement: that it was less connected to the act of cheating, but owed more to Gordon-Cumming's reputation as a womaniser, possibly including the propositioning of Lycett Green's wife.) Gordon-Cumming insisted they had been mistaken, and explained that he played the coup de trois system of betting, (Note: Also known as the masse en avant system.) in which if he won a hand with a £5 stake, he would add his winnings to the stake, together with another £5, as the stake for the next hand. (Note: £5 in 1890 is approximately equivalent to £600 in 2025, according to calculations based on the Consumer Price Index measure of inflation.) Edward, after hearing from his advisors and the accusers, believed what they had told him. In order to avoid a scandal involving the prince, Gordon-Cumming gave way to pressure from the attendant royal courtiers to sign a statement undertaking never to play cards again in return for a pledge that no-one present would speak of the incident to anyone else.

In consideration of the promise made by the gentlemen whose names are subscribed to preserve my silence with reference to an accusation which has been made in regard to my conduct at baccarat on the nights of Monday and Tuesday the 8th and 9th at Tranby Croft, I will on my part solemnly undertake never to play cards again as long as I live.

— (Signed) W. Gordon-Cumming

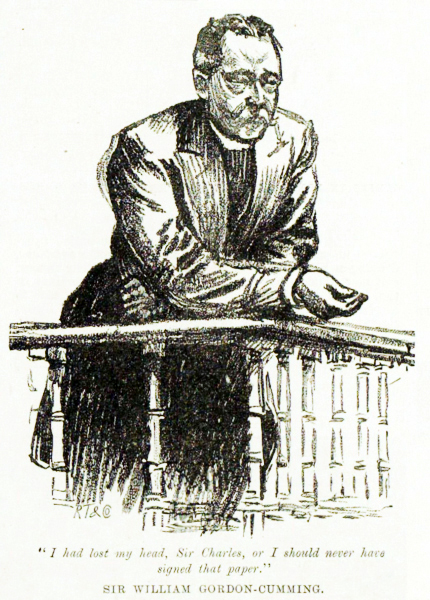
Gordon-Cumming and Edward, Prince of Wales, in court

Despite the pledge of silence, rumours of the incident began to circulate and were brought to Gordon-Cumming's attention. In an attempt to stop the rumours, he demanded a retraction from five of the house party: Stanley Wilson, Ethel and Edward Lycett Green, Mary Wilson and Levett. With no withdrawal forthcoming, on 6 February 1891, Gordon-Cumming issued writs for slander against the five, claiming £5,000 damages against each of them. (Note: £5,000 in 1891 is approximately equivalent to £549,300 in 2025, according to calculations based on the Consumer Price Index measure of inflation.)

The trial opened on 1 June 1891 at the Royal Courts of Justice, where entry to the court was only with a ticket. The Prince of Wales had been summoned as a witness, and he sat on a red leather chair on a raised platform between the judge and the witness box; his appearance was the first time since 1411 that an heir to the throne had appeared involuntarily in court. (Note: In 1411 it was Prince Henry who was committed for contempt of court by Judge William Gascoigne.)

The trial closed the following week, on 9 June 1891: the judge's summing up was "unacceptably biased" against Gordon-Cumming, according to Jason Tomes, Gordon-Cumming's biographer in the 2010 edition of the Oxford Dictionary of National Biography. The jury deliberated for only thirteen minutes before finding in favour of the defendants; their decision was greeted by prolonged hissing from some members of the galleries against the jury. The day after judgment was passed, the leader in The Times stated "He is ... condemned by the verdict of the jury to social extinction. His brilliant record is wiped out and he must, so to speak, begin life again. Such is the inexorable social rule ... He has committed a mortal offence. Society can know him no more." Gordon-Cumming's senior counsel, the Solicitor General Sir Edward Clarke, remained convinced of the blamelessness of his client and, in his 1918 memoirs, wrote "I believe the verdict was wrong, and that Sir William Gordon-Cumming was innocent".

== Aftermath ==
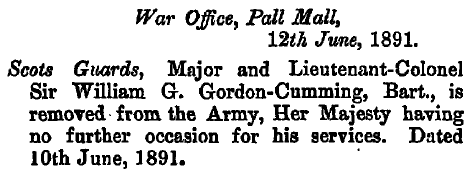
Gordon-Cumming's dismissal notice in The London Gazette, June 1891

As a result of the scandal, Gordon-Cumming was dismissed from the army the day after the trial concluded, and he resigned his membership of his four London clubs, the Carlton, Guards, Marlborough and Turf. The same day, 10 June 1891, he married his American fiancée, the heiress Florence Garner, who had supported him throughout the trial although Gordon-Cumming twice offered to break off their engagement because of the scandal. (Note: He had offered in January, once he had decided to take legal action and again after the verdict had been given.) The service took place at the Holy Trinity church in Chelsea with only a small congregation. Major Vesey John Dawson of the Coldstream Guards was Gordon-Cumming's best man and Lord Thurlow gave the bride away. When the couple returned to Scotland a few days later the locals from near his estate had decorated the station, and pulled the couple and their carriage through the streets by hand. According to the former Lord Chancellor, Michael Havers, the lawyer Edward Grayson and the historian Peter Shankland, the local people did not care that society considered Gordon-Cumming a social outcast.

The Prince of Wales was determined Gordon-Cumming should remain ostracised and he let it be known that anyone who acknowledged Gordon-Cumming or accepted invitations to shoot at the two Scottish estates Gordon-Cumming owned, would not be asked to Marlborough House—Edward's mansion in London—or be acknowledged at court. Edward wrote to his son, Prince George, the day after the trial "Thank God! – the Army and Society are now well rid of such a damned blackguard. The crowning point of his infamy is that he, this morning, married an American young lady, Miss Garner, ... with money!"

== Later life ==
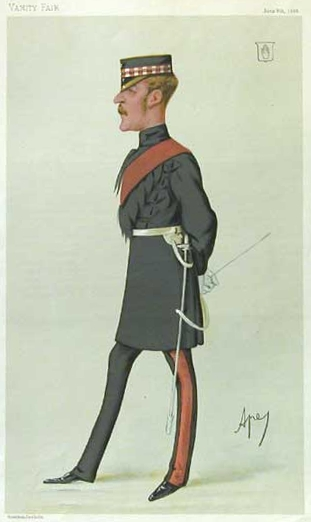
Gordon-Cumming as depicted by Carlo Pellegrini in Vanity Fair, 1880

Gordon-Cumming remained outside high society for the remainder of his life. He later told his daughter "among a host of acquaintances I thought I had perhaps twenty friends. Not one of them ever spoke to me again". Others of his friends only relented after the death of the prince in 1910, who was by that stage King Edward VII.

Gordon-Cumming and his wife had three sons and two daughters between 1892 and 1904. They renovated their Scottish properties and purchased one of the first cars in the highlands. In 1905 Florence's fortune collapsed and the couple were compelled to let or close up the houses on the Scottish estates and to move to Bridge House, Dawlish, Devon, with a reduced household of seven servants. Gordon-Cumming managed to disguise his contempt for the middle-class society to which he was now limited so that he could continue to indulge in golf, croquet, billiards, cricket, bridge and collecting postmarks. He also enjoyed his own company, and that of his dogs and pet monkey. He hated Dawlish, considered his wife a "fat little frump" and unapologetically engaged in persistent infidelity. Florence lost no opportunity to remind him who funded their life and eventually resorted to alcohol abuse.

After Gordon-Cumming visited South Africa in 1913–1914, the couple rented houses in Chelsea and Pitmilly, Fife, but increasingly they began to live apart. They had effectively separated before she died in 1922. In 1916 Gordon-Cumming ensured that the former leader of the Labour Party, Ramsay MacDonald, had his membership rescinded from the Moray Golf Club because of the latter's opposition to the First World War.

Gordon-Cumming died on 20 May 1930 at his Altyre home at the age of 81. He was succeeded in his title by his eldest son, Major Alexander Penrose Gordon-Cumming. His obituary in The Times stated "Though public opinion at the time did not dispute the verdict, it is fair to recall that it roundly condemned those who had taken part in the incident, recognising that a gallant career had been tragically ruined."

== Private life ==
Tomes thought that his subject possessed "audacity and wit [and] gloried in the sobriquet of the most arrogant man in London", while Sporting Life described him as "possibly the most handsome man in London, and certainly the rudest". The historian Philip Magnus thought him "guilty, predatory and mean". William Cavendish-Bentinck, 6th Duke of Portland, a friend of Gordon-Cumming, wrote of him:

I knew Bill Cumming very well, and for a long time liked and admired him greatly, both as a gallant soldier and as a fine sportsman. ... A friend of mine who went on an expedition with him was loud in praise of Bill's sportsmanship, bravery and unselfishness. ... But he had one serious failing: he could not play fair at cards, even when the stakes were extremely small.

Gordon-Cumming often peppered his speech with swearing, which he did in English and Hindustani. He was a regular at racecourses and casinos. The writer Elma Napier, one of Gordon-Cumming's daughters, described him thus in late age:

He never, not even when he was eighty, lost the touch of the swagger in his walk, the hint of scorn for lesser mortals, the suggestion that he was irresistible. He had worn it so long that neither trouble nor disgrace nor old age could change his habit.

Gordon-Cumming was a womaniser, and stated that his aim was to "perforate" members of "the sex". His preference was for uncomplicated relationships with married women, and he said that "all the married women try me"; his liaisons included Lillie Langtry, Sarah Bernhardt and Lady Randolph Churchill. Gordon-Cumming also owned a house in Belgravia, London; he would lend the premises to the prince for assignations with the royal mistresses. In 1890, three days before the events at Tranby Croft, the Prince of Wales returned early from travelling in Europe; he visited Harriet Street where he found his mistress, Daisy, Lady Brooke, "in Gordon-Cumming's arms", which soured the relationship between the two men.

After Gordon-Cumming's death in 1930, his house at Gordonstoun was obtained by Kurt Hahn, who turned it into the eponymous school. It has been attended by Prince Philip, Duke of Edinburgh, and his three sons, Charles, Andrew and Edward.

Two of Gordon-Cumming's granddaughters, Katie Fforde and Jane Gordon-Cumming, became writers. Gordon-Cumming has been portrayed in radio dramatisations by Michael Jayston, Conrad Phillips, Noel Johnson and Duncan McIntyre. On screen he has been portrayed by John Justin and Donald Douglas.

== Notes and references ==
=== Sources ===
==== Books ====
- Arnold, Catharine (2017). Edward VII: the Prince of Wales and the Women he Loved. New York: St. Martin's Press. ISBN 978-1-250-06914-6.
- Attwood, Gertrude (1988). The Wilsons of Tranby Croft. London: Hutton Press. ISBN 978-0-907033-71-4.
- Bruce, A. P. C. (1980). The Purchase System in the British Army, 1660-1871. London: Royal Historical Society. ISBN 978-0-9010-5057-1.
- Cavendish-Bentinck, William (1937). Men, Women and Things: Memories of the Duke of Portland. London: Faber & Faber. OCLC 4632837.
- Clarke, Sir Edward (1918). The Story of my Life. London: Penguin Books. OCLC 837472347.
- Diamond, Michael (2004). Victorian Sensation. London: Anthem Press. ISBN 978-1-84331-150-8.
- Dixon, David (1991). From Prohibition to Regulation: Bookmaking, Anti-Gambling and the Law. Oxford: Clarendon Press. ISBN 978-0-19-825616-8.
- Gordon-Cumming, William Gordon (1871). Wild Men and Wild Beasts: Scenes in Camp & Jungle. Edinburgh: Edmonston & Douglas. OCLC 776685270.
- Havers, Michael; Grayson, Edward; Shankland, Peter (1988). The Royal Baccarat Scandal. London: Souvenir Press Ltd. ISBN 978-0-285-62852-6.
- Hibbert, Christopher (2007). Edward VII: the Last Victorian King. New York: Palgrave Macmillan. ISBN 978-1-4039-8377-0.
- Magnus, Philip (1975). King Edward the Seventh. Harmondsworth, London: Penguin. ISBN 978-0-1400-2658-0.
- McHugh, Michael (2008). "The Rise (and Fall?) of the Barrister Class". In Gleeson, Justin; Higgins, Ruth (eds.). Rediscovering Rhetoric: Law, Language, and the Practice of Persuasion. Annandale, NSW: Federation Press. ISBN 978-1-86287-705-4.
- Napier, Elma (1948). Youth is a Blunder. London: Jonathan Cape. OCLC 2316211.
- Neillands, Robin (1996). The Dervish Wars: Gordon and Kitchener in the Sudan, 1880–1898. London: Murray. ISBN 978-0-7195-5631-9.
- Ridley, Jane (2012). Bertie: A Life of Edward VII. London: Chatto & Windus. ISBN 978-0-7011-7614-3.
- Teignmouth Shore, W., ed. (2006) [1932]. The Baccarat Case. London: Butterworth & Co. ISBN 978-1-84664-787-1.

==== Journals and magazines ====
- "Jury Room: The Baccarat Scandal". Radio Times. 26 September 1965. Archived from the original on 2 October 2023.
- "Saturday Playhouse: The Royal Baccarat Scandal". Radio Times. 28 December 1991. Archived from the original on 2 October 2023.
- "The Scandal at Tranby Croft". Radio Times. 20 September 1971. Archived from the original on 2 October 2023.
- "The Verdict of the Court". Radio Times. 23 October 1959. Archived from the original on 2 October 2023.

==== News ====
- "The Baccarat Case". Pall Mall Gazette. 1 June 1891. p. 4.
- "The Baccarat Case". The Times. 4 June 1891. p. 7.
- "The Baccarat Scandal". The Times. 3 March 1891. p. 10.
- "The Baccarat Scandal: The Truth About Tranby Croft". The Manchester Gazette. 19 February 1891. p. 8.
- "Leading Article: The Baccarat Case". The Times. 10 June 1891. p. 9.
- "Sir William Gordon-Cumming". The Times. 21 May 1930. p. 21.
- "Cumming Takes a Bride". The New York Times. 11 June 1891.

==== Websites ====
- "The Baccarat Scandal (1960)". British Film Institute. Archived from the original on 7 March 2021.
- Clark, Gregory (2023). "The Annual RPI and Average Earnings for Britain, 1209 to Present (New Series)". MeasuringWorth.
- "Jane Gordon-Cumming". The Richford Becklow Literary Agency. Archived from the original on 31 May 2023.
- "Katie Fforde". AudioBooksOnline. Archived from the original on 22 May 2014.
- "Scandal (1975)". British Film Institute. Archived from the original on 28 January 2023.
- Matthew, H. C. G. (2004). "Edward VII (1841–1910)". Oxford Dictionary of National Biography (online ed.). Oxford University Press. doi:10.1093/ref:odnb/32975. (Subscription, Wikipedia Library access or UK public library membership required.)
- "The Scots Guards". National Army Museum.
- Tomes, Jason (2010). "Cumming, Sir William Gordon Gordon-, fourth baronet (1848–1930)". Oxford Dictionary of National Biography (online ed.). Oxford University Press. doi:10.1093/ref:odnb/39392. (Subscription, Wikipedia Library access or UK public library membership required.)
- "Wild Men and Wild Beasts: Scenes in Camp and Jungle". WorldCat.

==== London Gazette ====
- "No. 23336". The London Gazette. 24 December 1867. p. 7008.
- "No. 23737". The London Gazette. 16 May 1871. p. 2350.
- "No. 24871". The London Gazette. 6 August 1880. p. 4312.
- "No. 25824". The London Gazette. 5 June 1888. p. 3127.
- "No. 26171". The London Gazette. 12 June 1891. p. 3118.

Baronetage of the United Kingdom
Preceded by Alexander Penrose Gordon-Cumming	Baronet (of Altyre); 1866–1930	Succeeded by Alexander Penrose Gordon-Cumming
