= Hull Grammar School =

School in Yorkshire, England

Location
- Cottingham Road; Hull, East Riding of Yorkshire, HU5 2DL; England
- Coordinates: 53.767081°N 0.394611°W

Information
- Type: Comprehensive
- Motto: Floreat Nostra Schola
- Established: c. 1330
- Closed: 2015
- Local authority: Hull
- Staff: 100+
- Gender: Boys
- Age: 11 to 16
- Enrolment: 1200+
- Houses: Wilberforce, Marvell, Alcock, and Gee (named for eminent Old Boys)
- Colours: Red and Black

Hull Grammar School was a secondary school in Hull, England, founded around 1330 and endowed in 1479 by the prelate John Alcock. In 1988, as part of a restructure by the Local Education Authority which saw the school lose its sixth form, the site was renamed William Gee School for Boys. In 2001 the latter merged with the girls-only Amy Johnson High School as Endeavour High School, before closing permanently in 2015.

== History ==
Hull Grammar School was founded around 1330 and endowed in 1479 as part of a chantry chapel by Bishop John Alcock (of Rochester, Worcester, and Ely), later Lord Chancellor and founder of Jesus College, Cambridge. Originally conducted by a chaplain (priest) endowed to sing Masses for Bishop Alcock's soul, the School flourished till its revenues were seized at the Protestant Reformation under the Chantries Act 1547. The people of Hull objected and eventually re-established the school, which was appropriated by the Crown in 1586.

The following year, Queen Elizabeth I granted the school house and associated property to Luke Thurcross, the mayor, who in 1604 entrusted his interest in the school and gardens to four trustees, to act on behalf of the mayor and burgesses. The appointment of masters was placed in the hands of the Hull Corporation, and by charter of James I, the right of presentation was secured to them. An exhibition of £40 to Cambridge University was endowed in 1627 and augmented in 1630, with another scholarship of £60 a year to Clare College, Cambridge. The poet Marvell was a pupil in this era, and his father the Rev. Andrew Marvell a master.

In 1892 the endowments produced about £80 a year, for which the master taught the Classics free, but the scholars paid for other subjects under Town Council regulations.

The Education Act 1944 placed the school under a local education authority, as part of the government's 'secondary education for all' policy. In 1969 the school became comprehensive. The local government reorganisation of 1974 saw education transferred from Hull City Council to the newly created Humberside County Council.

In 1988, the grammar school lost its sixth form and was renamed the William Gee School for Boys, merging with the nearby Amy Johnson School for girls in 2001 to form the Endeavour High School. This last was subsequently placed under special measures and finally closed in the summer of 2015.

The name "Hull Grammar" was acquired by a new and completely unconnected private school, which opened under that name in 1989, only to merge with Hull High School in 2005 to form the Hull Collegiate School.

== Location ==
In 1486 a schoolhouse was built for Bishop Alcock's chantry foundation in the Market Square of Kingston upon Hull, on South Church Side opposite Holy Trinity Church. This fine old brick pile now houses the interactive 'Hands-on History' Museum. Around 1578, the building having fallen into decay, Alderman William Gee (thrice Mayor of Hull) opened a subscription for the purpose of repairing it. This resulted in the erection of a new school, in which Alderman Gee was joined by the Corporation of Hull, who added a second storey, which was used as an exchange and assembly room. Alderman Gee not only contributed £80 and 20,000 bricks, but also left two houses in the 'Butchery' (now Queen Street) for the school's benefit. From inscriptions on three stones in the wall, the rebuild appears to have been completed in 1583 at a cost of £600. This building was purchased in 1875 by the vicar of Holy Trinity Church, who had it restored and converted into a mission room and choir school.

From 1875 to 1891 the grammar school rented temporary premises, but in the latter year a new and commodious building was erected on Leicester Street, officially opened by the Mayor of Hull on 27 January 1892. The new school was built in the Collegiate Gothic style, of red brick with stone dressings.

In the 20th century, the school moved onto Bishop Alcock Road in the Bricknell Avenue area of Hull. It remained there until 1988.

== Notable former pupils ==
- Adrian Hardy Haworth (1767–1833) entomologist, botanist and carcinologist.
- Prof John Aitken, Professor of Anatomy at UCL from 1965 to 1980 (1924–31)
- Sir Linton Andrews, Editor of the Yorkshire Post from 1939 to 1960, Director of the Yorkshire Post Group from 1950 to 1968 (1897–1904)
- Sir Colin Barker, Chairman of BTG from 1983 to 1993 (1938–45)
- Chief Superintendent Richard Clive Beacock of the Nottinghamshire Constabulary (1946–1953)
- Richard Bean, playwright, (1967–1974)
- Charles Bromby, Bishop of Tasmania
- Charles Cooper, Editor of The Scotsman from 1876 to 1906 (1841–8)
- William Gavin, proprietor of Vanity Fair from 1899 to 1908, also introduced the 1919 Bill in New York to legalise boxing (known as the Walker Law and later adopted by the other 44 states) and founded the National Boxing Association of America
- Air Marshal Sir Donald Percy Hall KCB, CBE, AFC, former Station Commander of RAF Akrotiri, Deputy Chairman GEC-Marconi from 1990 to 1995 (1942–9)
- Rev Richard Johnson, first chaplain to the prison colony in Sydney, Australia, 1788-1800
- Professor Roger Kitching AM, Professor of Ecology, Griffith University, Brisbane from 1992 to 2016 (HGS 1956–1963)
- Sir John Leng, MP for Dundee, newspaper owner of the Dundee Advertiser from 1851, Liberal MP for Dundee from 1899 to 1906, established the People's Friend (1839–46)
- Sir Cyril Lucas (1909–2002), marine biologist (1920–7)
- Andrew Marvell (1621–78): English metaphysical poet and patriot (his father, the Rev. Andrew Marvell M.A., was a master at the School)
- William Mason (1724–1797), the poet
- Sir Philip Mawer (1958–65)
- Dr. Isaac Milner (1750–1820) mathematician, inventor, President of Queens' College, Cambridge, Dean of Carlisle
- Rt Rev Ronald Milner, Bishop of Burnley from 1988 to 1993 (1938–45)
- Mike Noble, Labour MP for Rossendale from October 1974 to 1979 (1946–53)
- Roy North (born 1941), actor and television presenter
- Brian Smith OBE, High Commissioner to Botswana 1989–91, and to Trinidad and Tobago from 1991 to 1994 (1946–53)
- Sir Eric Smith CBE, FRS, marine biologist and Professor of Zoology at Queen Mary University from 1950 to 1965 (1920–7)
- Alderman Symons, M.R.I.A., Sheriff of Hull in 1890–1, local historian
- Alan Thompson, Labour MP for Dunfermline Burghs from 1959 to 1964 (1935–42)
- Prof John Thompson, Professor of Non-Linear Dynamics at UCL from 1991 to 2002 (1948–55)
- Maj.-General Thomas Perronet Thompson (1783–1869): Governor-General of Sierra Leone, British Parliamentarian, and radical reformer
- Dr. Thomas Watson, Bishop of St David's (1637–1717)
- William Wilberforce (1759–1833): British politician and philanthropist, leading opponent of slave trade
- Harry Wiles, UK Ambassador to Nicaragua from 2000 to 2002 (1955–62)
- Archdeacon Francis Wrangham M.A. (1769–1842), clergyman
