= Anlaby =

Village in the East Riding of Yorkshire, England

Coordinates: 53.745°N 0.432°W

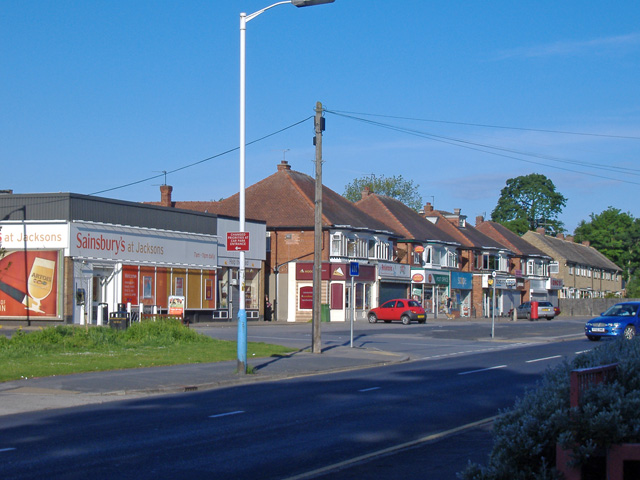
- Anlaby shops

- Location within the East Riding of Yorkshire
- OS grid reference: TA035287
  - London: 155 mi (249 km) S
- Civil parish: Anlaby with Anlaby Common
- Unitary authority: East Riding of Yorkshire
- Ceremonial county: East Riding of Yorkshire
- Region: Yorkshire and the Humber
- Country: England
- Sovereign state: United Kingdom
- Post town: HULL
- Postcode district: HU4, HU10
- Dialling code: 01482
- Police: Humberside
- Fire: Humberside
- Ambulance: Yorkshire
- UK Parliament: Kingston upon Hull West and Haltemprice

Anlaby is a village forming part of the western suburbs of Kingston upon Hull, in the East Riding of Yorkshire, England. It forms part of the civil parish of Anlaby with Anlaby Common.

== History ==
Anlaby is recorded in the Domesday Book as "Umlouebi" or "Unlouebi", a habitation within the manor of North Ferriby which was of 19 persons including a priest. The name is thought to derive from the Old Norse personal name Óláfr (or Unlaf, Anlaf) and by meaning 'farmstead': "Anlaf's village". By the beginning of the 13th century the village was known by the spelling "Anlauebi".

Shortly after the establishment of Kingston upon Hull by Edward I, a road from Hull to Anlaby was constructed in 1302.

In 1392 some inhabitants of Anlaby, Cottingham and 'Woolferton' rioted over the construction of canals supplying water from sources near their villages to Kingston upon Hull; approximately 1,000 are said to have laid siege unsuccessfully to Hull, and some of the ringleaders are said to have been hanged at York. Disputes over Hull's water supply continued until the 1410s, with the villages fouling the freshwater supply, and filling in the channels. In 1413 an admonitory letter from the Pope was issued, urging the villages to desist from their erroneous ways, after which the nuisance ceased.

A moated square structure, Moat Hill, 250 by 220 ft (76 by 67 m), with an 8-foot-deep (2.4 m) moat, on the western edge of the village is thought to have been constructed in the 14th century, and to have included a manor house.

During the English Civil War Anlaby was used as a base by Royalist forces, and fighting took place at Anlaby during the relief of the first siege of Hull (1642), and during the second siege (1643), during which an attack on the Royalists was repulsed.

Anlaby Hall was constructed around 1680, and extended in the early 18th century with modifications in the 19th century. Anlaby House was built in the late 18th century, and extended in the 19th.

In the 1850s the small hamlet of Anlaby contained few dwellings in addition to Anlaby Hall and House, and was set in an entirely rural and parkland environment. Wesleyan (built c. 1805) and Primitive Methodist Chapels had also been established by this time, and the area was considered a very desirable dwelling place.

The Anglican church of St Peter was built in 1865 to a design by William Kerby at a cost of £1,558. It was enlarged in 1885, and is mostly of brick in the decorated style, In 1885 the Hull and Barnsley Railway was constructed, running east–west one-third of a mile (0.54 km) to the north of the village. Between the 1890s and the 1930s little development took place, although a row of a terraced houses along Wolfreton Road north towards the hamlet of Wolfreton was built. Springhead Halt railway station on the Hull and Barnsley Railway opened in 1929 (closed 1955) serving the village, as part of a high frequency urban service.

Suburban housing developments began in the 1930s, and by the 1950s housing extended continuously along the roads to Willerby and Kirk Ella. Additionally, short lived housing estates were constructed on the fringes of the village during the Second World War: Lowfield Camp, and Tranby Crofts, an estate east of Tranby Croft. Lowfield Camp was used to house people from Hull displaced by the Hull Blitz, and later used as a transit camp for the British Army of the Rhine. The Tranby Crofts estate was still extant in the 1960s.

Substantial development took place in the post war period. By the 1960s urban sprawl had extended between Anlaby, Willerby and Kirk Ella, and towards the western fringes of housing developments on the former Anlaby Common which had become contiguous with Kingston upon Hull. During the 1960s light industrial development began on the north side of Springfield Way.

Urban housing expansion of Anlaby was practically complete by the 1970s, including development on the ancient Moat Hill. Industrial development along Springfield Way was completed, including that on part of the embankment of the former Hull and Barnsley Line that had closed in the 1960s. In the early 1970s the Haltemprice sport centre was constructed north-west of the original village centre; subsequently the pattern of development remained fundamentally unchanged to the present day (2010).

Anlaby was formerly a township in the parishes of Kirk-Ella and Hessle, in 1866 Anlaby became a separate civil parish, on 1 April 1935 the parish was abolished and merged with Haltemprice and Sculcoates. In 1931 the parish had a population of 1,734.

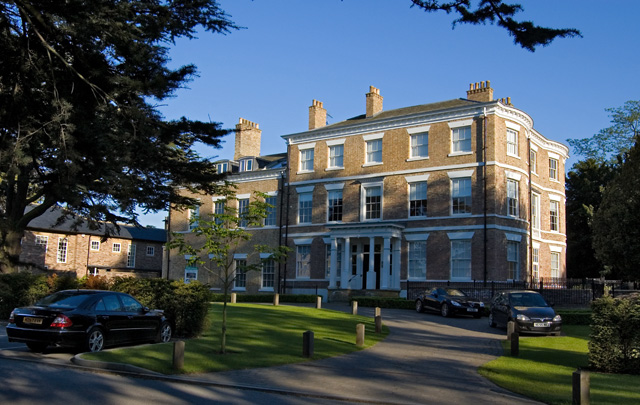
Anlaby House, late 18th century

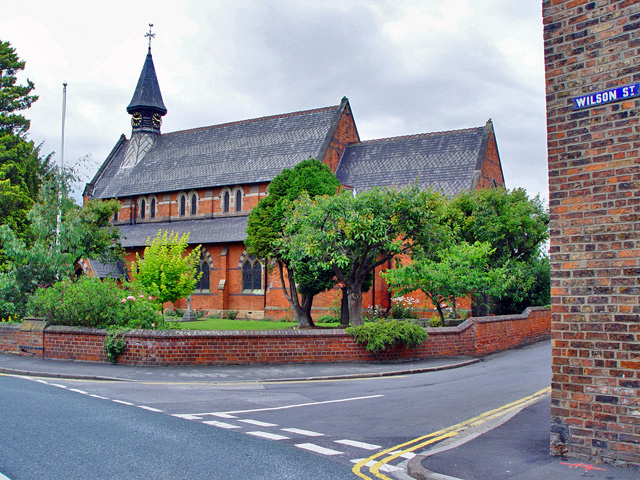
St. Peter's Church, built 1865, Wilson Street

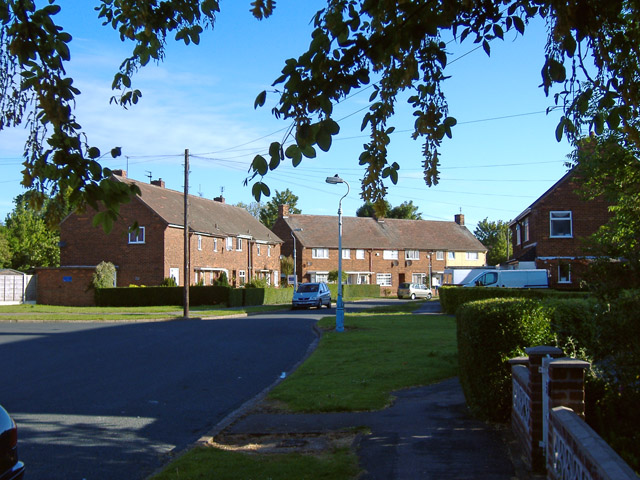
Early post Second World War, suburban housing (c. 1960)

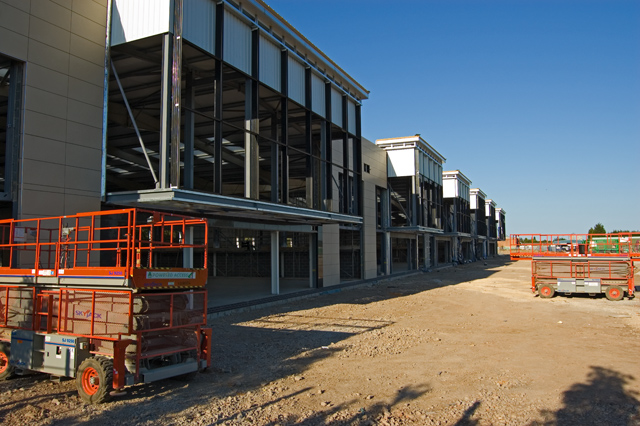
Retail units under construction, Springfield Way (2009)

== Geography ==
The village is bordered by and contiguous with Willerby and Kirk Ella to the north and west; the dismantled Hull and Barnsley Railway forms a partial barrier with Willerby. To the east are suburbs of Hull, including Anlaby Park, separated by limited green space, mainly playing fields. Hessle is over 1.25 miles (2 km) to the south, separated by agricultural fields. The B1231 (Springfield Way) passes through the village. The village and surrounding area is situated on level land at approximately 33 feet (10 m) above sea level.

== Facilities ==
The area is primarily residential, with industrial and commercial premises on Springfield Way. A new shopping development 'Anlaby Retail Park' opened in 2010, replacing late 20th century light industrial development; the new retail park is directly east of a large Morrison's supermarket (1993, rebuilt and expanded 2003). Anlaby Retail Park is home to a supermarket and other retailers.

Anlaby Primary School is located on the eastern fringe of the village. In the village centre, there is a Sainsbury's Local, Cooplands and many other shops.

Hull Collegiate School is a private school situated on the outskirts of Anlaby providing education from Kindergarten through to Sixth Form.

== See also ==
- Listed buildings in Anlaby with Anlaby Common
