= Tranby Croft =

Country house in the East Riding of Yorkshire, England

Coordinates: 53°44′24″N 0°26′55″W

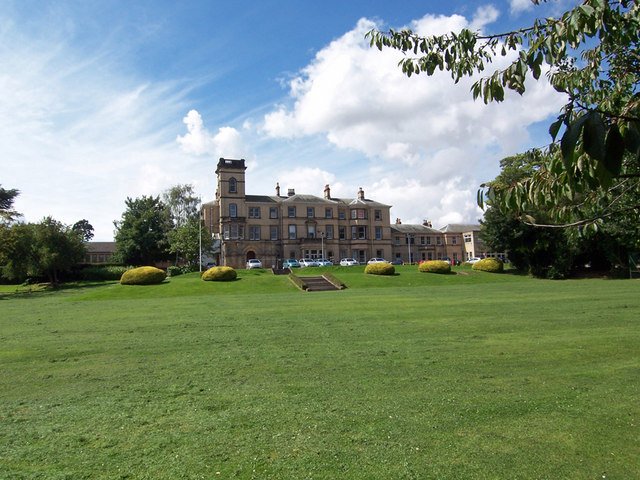
Tranby Croft

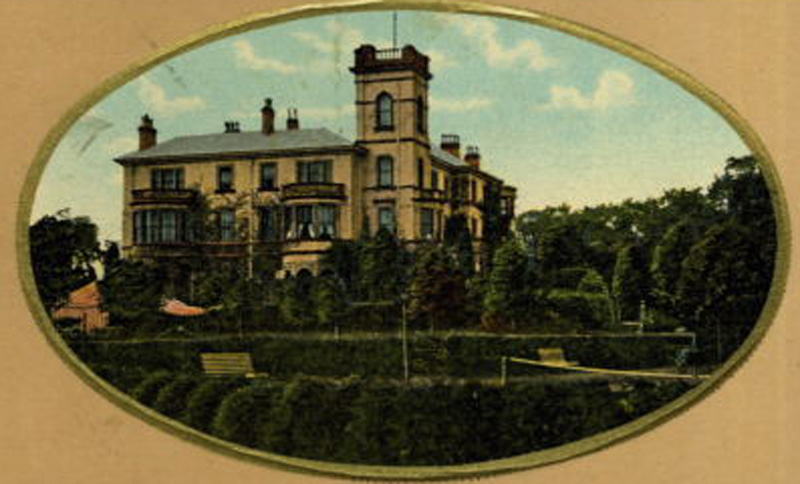
Tranby Croft about 1920

Tranby Croft is a large Grade II listed Victorian country house and estate at Anlaby, near Hull in the East Riding of Yorkshire, England. The house is now the co-educational, independent day school, Tranby School. It was the location of the Tranby Croft affair in 1890.

The house is built in white brick with ashlar dressing in three storeys with a nine bay frontage.

== History ==
Tranby Croft was built c. 1874 by Hull shipowner Arthur Wilson (1836–1909). In 1890 the house was the location of the royal baccarat scandal, also known as the Tranby Croft affair, which involved accusations that Sir William Gordon-Cumming, 4th Baronet, had cheated at illegal card games attended by Albert Edward, Prince of Wales. The reputational damage was long-lasting. In Moonraker (1955) by Ian Fleming, Hugo Drax cheating at cards is characterised as "Tranby Croft all over again".

Arthur was succeeded by his son Captain Arthur Stanley Wilson (1868–1938), who was the Conservative MP for Holderness.

Hull High School for Girls moved to Tranby Croft after the Second World War and Hull Grammar School moved to Tranby Croft from its Cottingham site in 2005. The two schools merged into Hull Collegiate School, which in 2021 was renamed Tranby.

== See also ==
- Listed buildings in Anlaby with Anlaby Common
