= Siege of Hull =

Siege of Hull may refer to:

- Siege of Hull (1642)
- Siege of Hull (1643)
