= Alexander Ross (British Army officer) =

British officer

General Alexander Ross (1742–1827) was a British officer who served in the American War of Independence and in India, rising to the rank of general. He was a close friend of Charles Cornwallis, 1st Marquess Cornwallis.

== Life ==
Alexander Ross was born in Scotland in 1742, the youngest of the five sons of Ross of Auchlossin. He entered the army as ensign in the 50th Regiment of Foot in February 1760. He was gazetted lieutenant in the 14th Regiment of Foot on 18 September 1765. After serving in Germany Ross returned to England in May 1775.

Lieutenant Ross became captain on 30 May, and served with distinction throughout the American War of Independence. He was aide-de-camp to Lord Cornwallis and was sent home by him with the despatches of the Battle of Camden on 16 Aug. 1780. He was made major in the 45th Regiment of Foot on 25 October 1780. He represented Lord Cornwallis as commissioner in arranging the details of the surrender of Yorktown. In May 1782 he was sent to Paris to arrange for the exchange of Lord Cornwallis, which was only effected by the peace of 20 January 1783. In August 1783 Ross was appointed deputy adjutant-general in Scotland, with the rank of lieutenant-colonel, and he served in a similar capacity in India under Lord Cornwallis. He became colonel on 12 October 1793. In August 1794 he went with Earl Spencer and Thomas Grenville to Vienna on a special mission to arrange that Lord Cornwallis should command the allies against the French. Their efforts were unsuccessful. He accompanied Lord Cornwallis as major-general to Warley camp in April 1795, and two months later was nominated Surveyor-General of the Ordnance in succession to George Cranfield Berkeley.

Ross was promoted lieutenant-general on 29 April 1802 and general on 1 January 1812. He became colonel of the 89th (The Princess Victoria's) Regiment of Foot in 1797, transferring to the 59th (2nd Nottinghamshire) Regiment of Foot in 1801. He was also Governor of Fort George and Fort Augustus from 1804 to his death.

He was one of the most intimate friends of Lord Cornwallis, whose correspondence, in three volumes, was edited in 1859 by his son, Charles Ross. He died in London on 20 November 1827. On 15 October 1795 Ross married Isabella Barbara Evelyn, daughter of Sir Robert Gunning, 1st Baronet.

Military offices
Preceded by George Cranfield Berkeley	Surveyor-General of the Ordnance; 1795–1804	Succeeded by James Murray Hadden
Preceded by Andrew Gordon	Colonel of the 59th (2nd Nottinghamshire) Regiment of Foot; 1801–1827	Succeeded by Sir Frederick Philipse Robinson
Preceded by Henry Bowyer	Colonel of the 89th Regiment of Foot; 1797–1801	Succeeded by James Ogilvie
Preceded by William Dalrymple	Governor of Fort George and Fort Augustus; 1804–1827	Succeeded by Sir David Baird
