= Martin Beckman =

Sir Martin Beckman (1634/35–1702) was a draughtsman/painter, Swedish-English colonel, chief engineer and master gunner of England.

== Life ==
Beckman was born in Stockholm, the son of Melcher Beckman and his wife Chistiana van Benningen. He left Sweden around 1645 to serve Charles I during the English Civil War. His brother, also a military engineer serving Charles, was taken prisoner by the parliament forces in 1644, but after some time on bread and water, was released in a poor state of health. In 1653 he joined the royalist exiles at Middelburg, the bearer of important information from England, and died before the Restoration. Martin Beckman in 1660 petitioned Charles II for the place of royal engineer, formerly enjoyed by his brother, and mentioned that he "was ruined and severely injured by an accident at an explosion in the preparation of fireworks to be shown on the water in the king's honour." He was accordingly employed as an engineer, and his skill in laboratory work led to his appointment on 6 June 1661 to the expedition under Edward Montagu, 1st Earl of Sandwich as "firemaster with and in his majesty's fleete".

He sailed from Deptford with the fleet on 13 June in the ship Augustine, and, after a short time at Alicante, proceeded against the pirates of Algiers; but, the enterprise failing, the fleet bore away for Tangiers, of which possession was taken as part of the dowry of Catherine of Braganza on 30 January 1662. A governor and garrison were left there, and the fleet proceeded to Lisbon to escort Queen Catherine to England. Plans of the actions at Algiers were made by Beckman and later engraved. In Tangier, Beckman made plans of the place and proceeded to erect a number of fortifications, mainly outlying fortlets. A plan of Tangiers was sent home before the fleet returned, and Samuel Pepys mentions in his Diary under 28 February 1662, that he presented to the Duke of York from Lord Sandwich "a fine map of Tangiers, done by one Captain Martin Beckman, a Swede, that is with my lord. We stayed looking over it a great while with the duke." This map is in the collection of George III in the British Museum.

In 1663, the new governor of Tangier, the Earl of Teviot, pressed Beckman to design such fortifications as he considered necessary, estimated to cost £200,000, but dismissed him within days with a promissory note on two Dutch merchants in lieu of pay. Beckman was so infuriated at his treatment by Teviot that he went to Spain and offered to betray Tangier to the Duke of Medina-Sidonia in exchange for a "Regiment of Foot" and money. Having had chance to reflect on his actions, he realised that Spanish occupation of Tangier would result in his colleagues being imprisoned. He returned to England and was to confess all to the king, but was betrayed by the same Dutch merchants. He was committed to the Tower, but wrote to the King of Sweden, begging his intersession. He was released and went to serve the King of Sweden in Stade. A plan of Tangier was sent to Sweden.

As noted, in 1663 Beckman was committed a prisoner to the Tower of London. He stated, in a petition to the king and council for a trial, that he had been half a year a close prisoner through the malice of one person for discovering the designs of the Spaniards and others against his majesty. He thereupon left England. After the raid up the Medway by the Dutch fleet under Michiel de Ruyter in 1667, he wrote on 24 June to the king from Stade in Bremen, that he had brought to perfection a mode of firing ships which he offered for service against the Dutch, who had done him infinite wrongs. He was then recalled, and consulted as to fortifications at Sheerness to guard the Medway. He was placed in charge of these defences until on 19 October 1670 he was nominated engineer to the office of ordnance, and third engineer of Great Britain from 1 July of that year.

On 9 May of the following year, when Colonel Thomas Blood and his accomplices stole the crown and sceptre from the jewel-house in the Tower of London, Beckman, whose official residence was in the Tower, heard the alarm, and after a severe struggle made Blood a prisoner. Beckman was awarded £100 for his share in the capture.

In 1672 he visited Carlisle and Clifford's Fort at the mouth of the Tyne, plans of which and some cleverly executed water-colour views are in the British Museum. In the following year he was an engineer of the ordnance train in the expedition against Holland under Prince Rupert, and took part in the naval engagements of 28 May, 4 June, and 11 August. At the end of 1674 Charles II gave verbal directions that his salary should be increased by £150 per annum. In January 1678 he was appointed with Sir Bernard de Gomme and Sir Jonas Moore on a commission to strengthen the fortifications of Portsmouth and to fortify Gosport, and buy land for the purpose. On 3 March a royal warrant secured to him the reversion of chief engineer of Great Britain on the death of Sir Bernard De Gomme.

About this time he was promoted to be major in the army. On 7 February 1681 he was appointed second engineer of Great Britain, and went to Hull as a commissioner to carry out the defence works there, and also reported on the defences of Holy Island and Berwick-on-Tweed in 1682 and 1683. In April 1683 he was recalled from Hull to join Lord Dartmouth's expedition to Tangier as chief engineer. Samuel Pepys sailed with this expedition, and his narrative of the voyage was published in 1841. On 29 August, when at sea, Pepys read Beckman's project for the destruction of Tangier. The object of the expedition – the destruction of the mole and defences of Tangier and the withdrawal of the garrison – having been satisfactorily accomplished, Beckman went to Gibraltar, and made a plan of the Rock of Gibraltar in two sheets, which is now in the King's Library, British Museum. After his return to England he was sent to Scotland to design works for strengthening Stirling, and he also reported on the defences of fortifications across England: Carlisle Castle, The Castle, Newcastle, Tynemouth Castle, Scarborough Castle, Chester Castle, Yarmouth Castle, and Landguard Fort.

Shortly after the accession of James II, he was knighted (20 March 1686). On 11 June 1685, when Lord Dartmouth raised his royal regiment of fusiliers, Beckman was given a commission as captain in it, the regiment being generally quartered at the Tower of London. On 23 December 1685 he succeeded De Gomme, who had died, as chief engineer of Great Britain.

On 14 February 1688 he supervised by royal command a display of fireworks from his own design on the occasion of the queen's delivery of a son. On 11 August he was appointed "comptroller of fireworkes as well for war as for triumph", with an allowance of £200. a year. He thus became the first head of the royal laboratory at Woolwich and principal storekeeper.

On 15 October he was appointed chief engineer of the king's train against William of Orange, but no action was necessary, and he returned to London and served under William. During the absence this year on account of ill-health of Sir Henry Sheeres, Surveyor-General of the Ordnance, Beckman acted for him. In 1689 he was busy with the defences of Hull and Berwick-on-Tweed, and obtained a royal warrant (23 August) for the execution of his proposed fortifications in the Isle of Wight.

Naturalization of Sir Martin Beckman Act 1691
- Act of Parliament
- Parliament of England
- Long title: An Act for naturalizing Sir Martin Beckman and others.
- Citation: 3 Will. & Mar. c. 4 Pr.
- Territorial extent: England and Wales

Dates
- Royal assent: 24 December 1691
- Commencement: 22 October 1691 (Note: Start of session.)

Status: Current legislation

In 1691 he accompanied Major-general Thomas Tollemache to Ireland, landing at Dublin at the latter end of May, and took part under Godart de Ginkel in the Siege of Athlone in June, the Battle of Aghrim on 12 July, and the Siege of Limerick in August and September. He was appointed on 28 February 1692 to be colonel commanding the ordnance train for the sea expedition, and in April he sat as a member of General Ginkel's committee on the organisation of the train. In June he embarked with the train and a force of seven thousand men under the Duke of Leinster, for a descent upon the French coast; but the French troops proving too numerous in the vicinity of La Hague, the troops were landed at Ostend. They captured Veurne and Diksmuide, which Beckman strengthened with new works. He returned to England at the end of October. In 1693 he again commanded the ordnance train in the summer expedition.

At the end of May 1694 he sailed in command of the train and of all the bomb-vessels and machines, with the troops under Thomas Tollemache, and arrived with the fleet at Camaret Bay on 7 June, when the land attack failed. Dieppe and Le Havre were then reduced to ruins by Beckman's bomb-vessels, and the whole coast so harassed and alarmed that the inhabitants had to be forcibly kept in the coast towns. Having returned to St. Helens on 26 July, Beckman and his bomb-vessels went with the fleet under Sir Clowdisley Shovell to the attack of Dunkirk and Calais in September, and then returned to England.

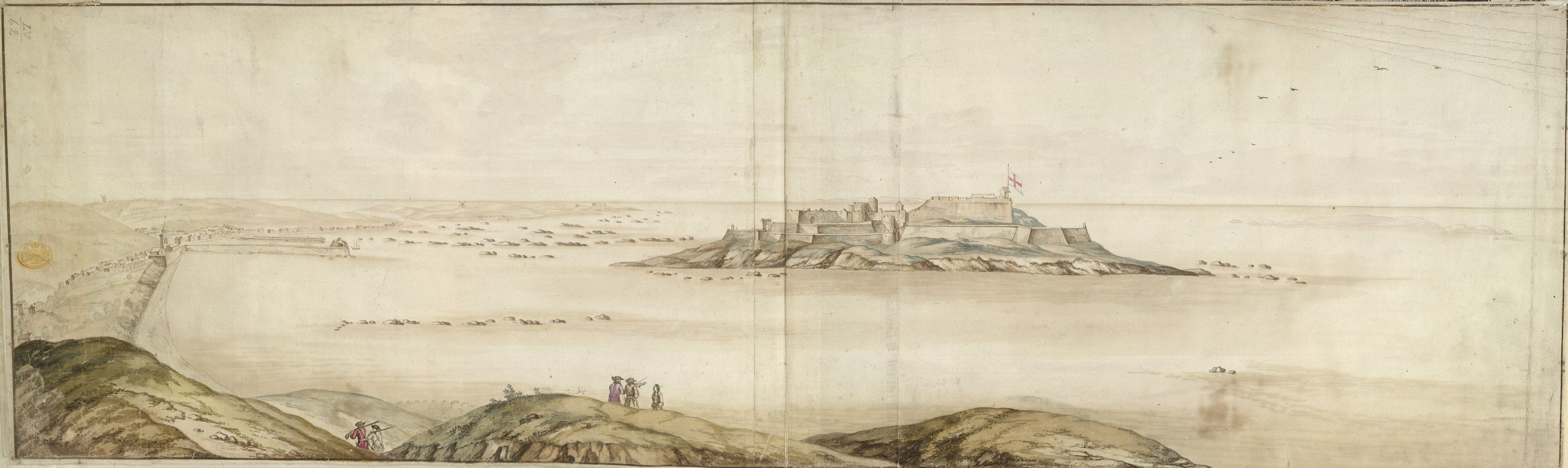
Castle Cornet

He afterwards visited the Channel Islands and reported on the defences of Guernsey. His plans of St. Peter's, Castle Cornet, and the Bouche de Vale, with water-colour sketches, are in the British Museum.

On 22 May 1695 Beckman was appointed to the command of the ordnance train and the machine and bomb-vessels for the summer expedition to the straits of Gibraltar, and took part in the operations on the coast of Catalonia, returning home in the autumn. His demands for projectiles for his bomb-vessels were so large that the board of ordnance represented that parliament had made no provision to meet them. He exercised a similar command in the summer expedition under Lord Berkeley, which sailed at the end of June 1696 to "insult the coast of France". On 3 July Berkeley detached a squadron of ten ships of war under Captain Mees, E..N., and Beckman with his bomb-vessels. They entered St. Martin's, Isle of Rhé, on the 5th under French colours, which they struck as soon as they had anchored. They bombarded the place all that night and the following day, expending over two thousand bombs and destroying the best part of the town. On the 7th they sailed for Olonne, where a like operation produced a similar result, and then rejoined the fleet, returning to Torbay. These enterprises created such alarm that over a hundred batteries were ordered by the French ministry to be erected between Brest and Goulet, and over sixty thousand men were continually in arms for coast defence.

Early in 1697 Beckman surveyed all the bomb-vessels, ten of which he reported to be in good condition and fitted to take in twenty mortars "which are all we have serviceable". On the general thanksgiving for peace on 2 December Beckman designed the fire-work display before the king and the royal family in St. James's Square, London; his drawing representation of it is in the King's Library, British Museum. Beckman took painting lessons from the Dutch painter Jan Wyck. Lack of money for defences caused Beckman as much difficulty as his predecessors and successors in office. Representations of insecurity – in regard to Portsmouth, for example, in 1699 – led to many plans and reports, but nothing was effected.

Beckman died in London on 24 June 1702. He appears to have married Elizabeth, daughter of Talbot Edwards, keeper of the crown jewels. She was buried at the Tower of London on 12 December 1677. Two sons, Peter and Edward, were also buried there on 7 February 1676 and 29 June 1678 respectively. The board of ordnance wrote to Marlborough that Beckman's death was a very great loss. The post remained unfilled for nine years.
