= Fortifications of Kingston upon Hull =

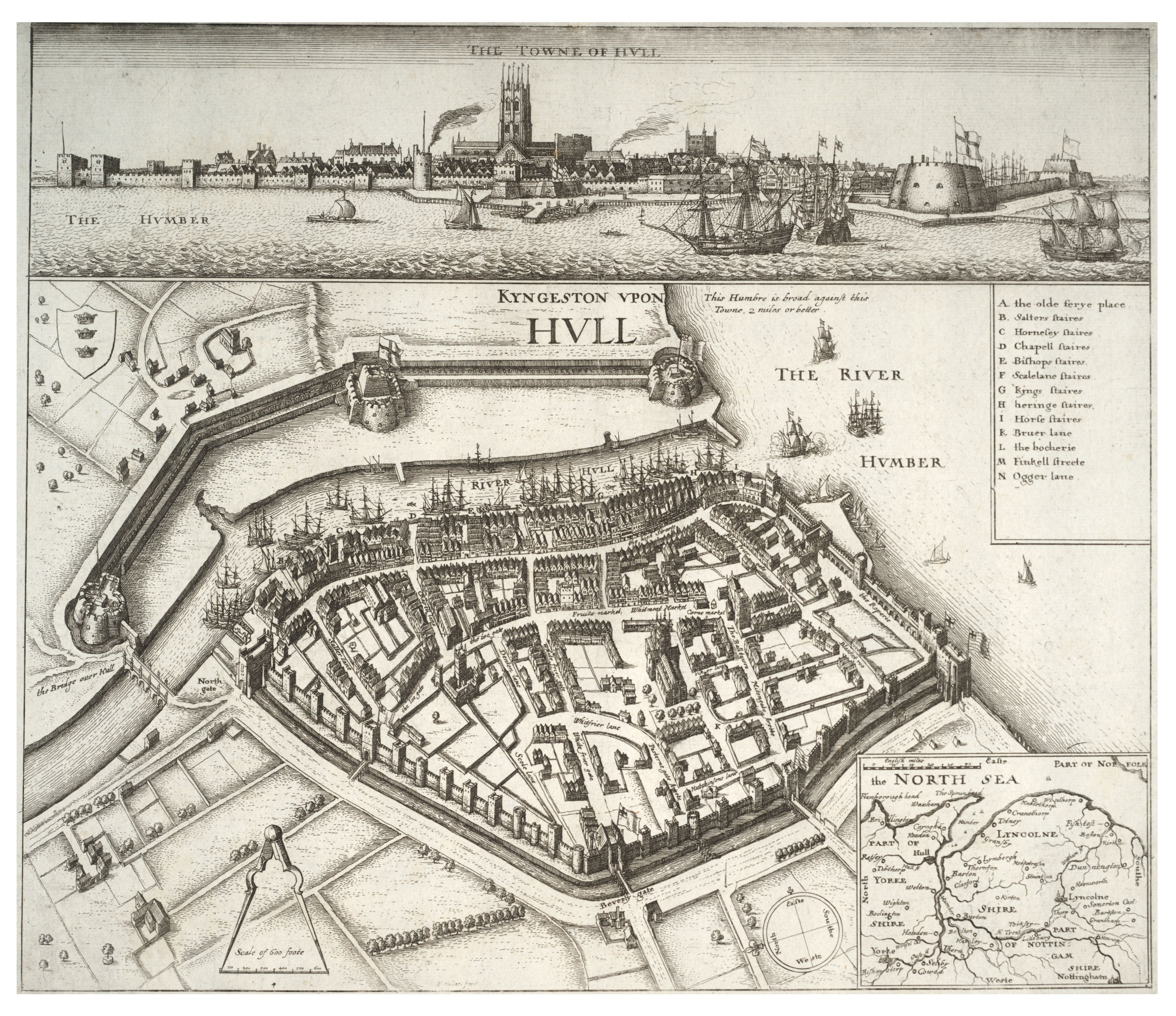
Wenceslas Hollar's map of Hull, c. 1640 with walls and castle shown. (up is east)

The fortifications of Kingston upon Hull consisted of three major constructions: the brick built Hull town walls, first established in the early 14th century (Edward I), with four main gates, several posterngates, and up to thirty towers at its maximum extent; Hull Castle, on the east bank of the River Hull, protecting Hull's river harbour, constructed in the mid 16th century (Henry VIII) and consisting of two blockhouses and a castle connected by a curtain wall; and the later 17th century Citadel, an irregular triangular, bastioned, primitive star fort replacing the castle on the east river bank.

The town walls were demolished and replaced with the town docks over approximately 50 years from the 1770s, the Citadel was demolished and the site turned over to shipbuilding and dock activities in the 1860s.

== City Walls ==
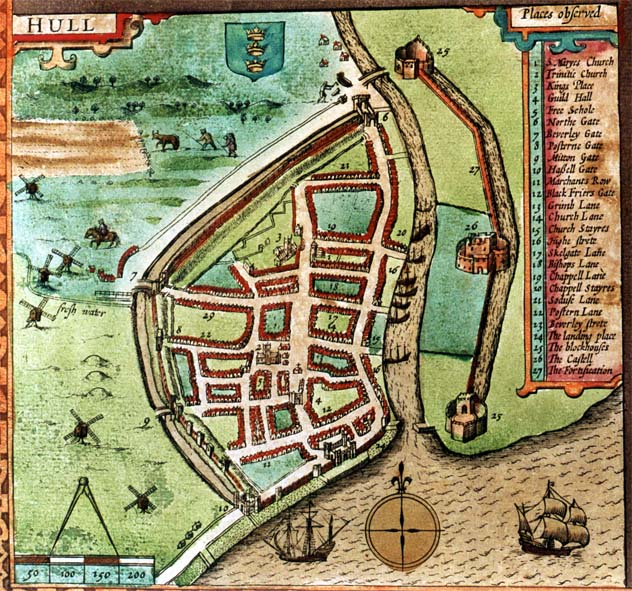
John Speed's map of 1611. Hessle (Hassle), Myton (Mitton), North (Northe), Beverley and Posterne gates are shown, as well as the castle

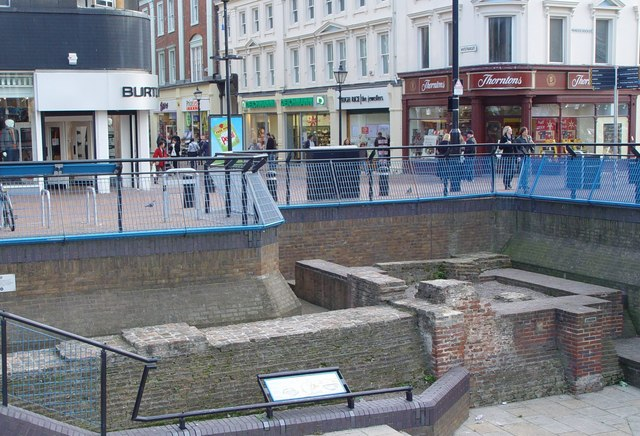
Excavated foundations of the Beverley Gate

The early Hull is thought to have been surrounded by a ditch, in the 14th century, construction of walled defences began. During the reign of Edward I, in 1322 the town gained the right of murage for five years; in 1327 permission to crenelate was granted – including the construction of a fortified wall and houses. Additional grants of murage were given in 1341, and in 1348. The circuit of walls is thought to have been completed by sometime around 1356, built primarily of brick. The plan of the fortified town has been said (Parker, 1853; Viollet-le-Duc, 1856) to be similar to that of the contemporary Bastides of France, in particular Libourne, also founded under Edward I.

When built the walls stretched from the west bank of the Hull to the bank of the Humber Estuary. By 1640 there were with barbicans constructed across a moat at either end; Northgates near the River Hull, and Hesslegates near the Humber. There were intermediate gates at Beverley Gate and Myton Gate. There was also a wall against the Humber, from Hessle Gate to the confluence of River Hull and Humber Estuary at South End; on this part of the wall a gate (Water Gate, or Mamhole Gate (Note: In the 1600s a tower in the mid point of the south walls on the Humber banks is referred to as "Mally Tower", and the land outside the walls known as South End, which was still used as a disposal place.)) gave access to the Humber, by a small piece of land known as the Mamhole, used as the town dump amongst other purposes. Except at the mamhole the south walls were built up to the banks of the Humber. There were no walls on the bank of the River Hull, and soft ground at Northgates near the river bank prevented the walls being contiguous up to the river bank, in 1585 the fortifications at this gap were improved; a mud wall was constructed, and in 1630 an earthen wall with brick facing and a palisade was built.

In addition to the five main gates several posterns in the wall existed, only wide enough for a person, each surmounted by a manned tower. Known examples are Low Gate in the north wall, and at the end of the streets Posterngate, and Blackfriargate (Blanket Row) on the western walls. In the 16th century John Leland stated that there were over twenty towers in the circuit of the walls; (Note: Leland's description is thought to be inaccurate in some other respects, and may have been a second had account.) the exact number is unknown, early maps show up to 30 towers in total. After Henry VIII's visit in 1541 all entrances except the main gates, as well as North and Hessle gates were ordered to be walled up.

During the English Civil War the fortifications were added to, with "hornworks" ('half moon' artillery batteries) built outside the main gates, additional defences connected the batteries, possibly as high as the original walls (14 ft), and a wide ditch outside the walls (later known as "Bush Dike") was added. The earthen ramparts behind the town walls were also built up at this time; in November 1646 a 50-yard section of wall to the north of Myton gate collapsed during the sieges, due to causes that may have included rain, excess weight of the earth bank and weight of the guns on the wall.

During the late 17th and 18th centuries, the walls continued to be maintained; Beckman's report (1680) recommended the repair or reconstruction of 235 yards of the walls. In 1735 a tower over Beverley Gate was removed due to its poor condition, and Hessle Gate unblocked in 1761; the walls were reported to be in very poor condition in 1752. In 1774 the walls from North Gate to Harry Ogle's Tower, (Note: Harry Ogle's Tower was named after a prisoner who had been incarcerated there, reputed to have escaped, and cut his throat before running towards the Humber before dying. It may have been the same tower known as Mally Tower (also "the Mallow").) on the Humber bank were granted to the Hull Dock Company for the construction of a new town dock.

=== The river chain ===
Entrance to the town via the River Hull was protected by a chain hung across the river's mouth. A tower on the east bank may have been installed in 1380; in the 1460s during the period of turmoil during Henry VI's reign, a chain and windlass was installed (or renewed) across the mouth of the River Hull to be able to prevent any hostile ship entering the River Hull. After Henry VIII's visit the east side chain tower was improved. In the 1590s during a period of expected invasion from the Netherlands improvements were ordered to the chain; the attachment of logs to cause it to float when deployed.

=== Demolition – Hull town docks, 1774–1829 ===
In 1774 the Hull Dock Act established the Hull Dock Company, entitled to raise £100,000 of capital through share issues and loans. It inherited the city walls, ditches and related defences west of the river. (Note: Excluding the walls on the Humber Bank east of Harry Ogle's Tower.) The town docks were subsequently built along the route of the walls, which were demolished. The first dock (1778, renamed Queen's Dock in 1854) was built in the area occupied by Beverley and North gates, and the intermediate walls, which were demolished, a second dock (Humber Dock, 1809) was built on the land between Hessle and Myton gates, and a third dock between the two was opened 1829 as Junction Dock (later Prince's Dock).

The southern stretch of walls were removed in the early 1800s; by 1813 the land at Hull on the banks of the Humber had been extended southwards beyond the original wall and bank by dumping of material excavated during the construction of the town docks.

== The Castle ==
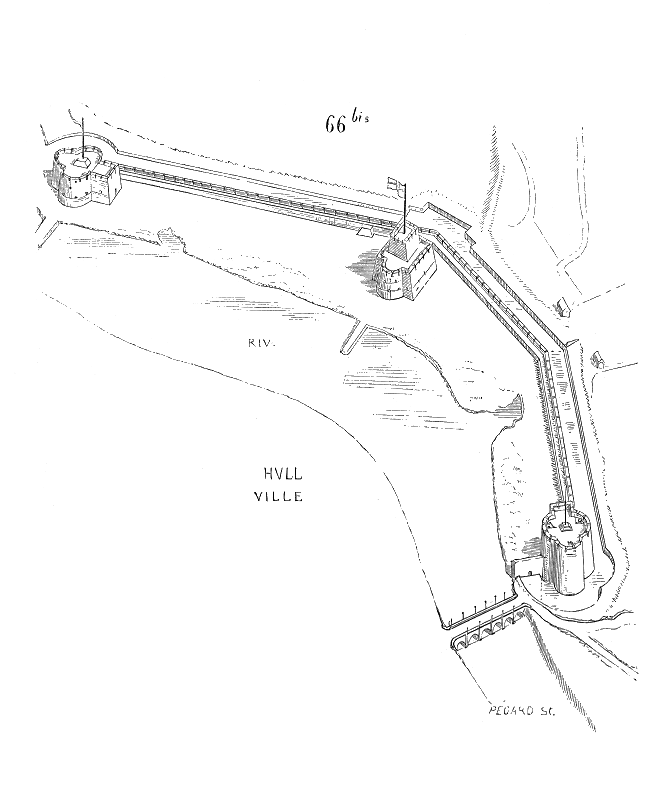
Plan of the Castle, derived from Wenceslas Hollar's map of Hull c. 1640

During the Pilgrimage of Grace (1536) control of Hull was briefly taken by the rebels. After the rebellion, in late 1541 King Henry VIII visited Hull, and instructed that the fortifications be improved; in addition to scouring of the moat, and repairs and improvements to the walls and gates, he instructed that the de la Pole house, which had become the King's property was to be made into the town's citadel, and modifications made to the drainage system outside the town, so that the fields could be flooded at times of threat.

In February 1542 Henry's plan for Hull had expanded in scope – to the construction of a fortress in addition to the walls – Henry appointed Michael Stanhope as his commander in Hull, providing £18,000 for the castle's construction. Hull Castle was completed by the end of 1543, using locally made brick, as well as stone, some provided through the recently dissolved monastery at Meaux Abbey, as well as from St Mary's church in Hull.

The structure was built on the east bank of the Hull, with three forts, connected by a wall, stretching from the opposite bank of the Hull to Northgates, south to the Humber estuary. The central fort "Hull Castle" was supported by two blockhouses on either end of the wall. At the same time as a bridge "North Bridge" was constructed across the Hull, just outside the walls; it was the first river bridge in Hull.

The castle was a three-storey structure, 66 by 50 ft (20 by 15 m) with walls 8 ft (2.4 m) deep, surrounded by a 19 ft (5.8 m) thick outer wall, the blockhouses were slight smaller area, two-storey structures, trefoil in shape, with rectangular building on the fourth corner in the direction of the joining walls.

In 1552 control of the Castle and blockhouses was transferred to the town of Hull.

On 16 September 1643 the north blockhouse was partially destroyed during the second Siege of Hull, and the north bridge damaged when the magazine was accidentally ignited by a careless gunner. Both were later repaired at a cost of £2,000.

In 1657 the castle was requiring repairs estimated to cost £5,000, and in 1670 storms caused damage to the south blockhouse that undermined its stability. In the 1680s the fortifications of Hull as well as Tilbury, Sheerness, and Portsmouth were ordered. The work on the Hull castle, under the control of Swedish engineer Martin Beckman would transform the fortifications on the east bank of the Hull into modern triangular fort, with governors house, magazine, and three barracks buildings that became known as the Hull Citadel. The southern blockhouse and castle were incorporated into the Citadel, with the connecting wall removed. The northern blockhouse was outside the boundaries of the new fort, and was retained, later let for commercial purposes, before being demolished in 1802.

Major Alexander Gordon Carte, Barrack-Master of the Hull Citadel was an exhibitor at the Great Exhibition in 1851 :- Pocket apparatus for throwing a line to a stranded ship. Self-acting life-buoy, invented in 1831; by its means, since 1838, the lives of nearly 400 persons had been saved. Sea-service rocket apparatus, for throwing a line from a vessel to the shore, or to another in distress at sea. Self-adjusting cork life-belt.

== The Citadel ==
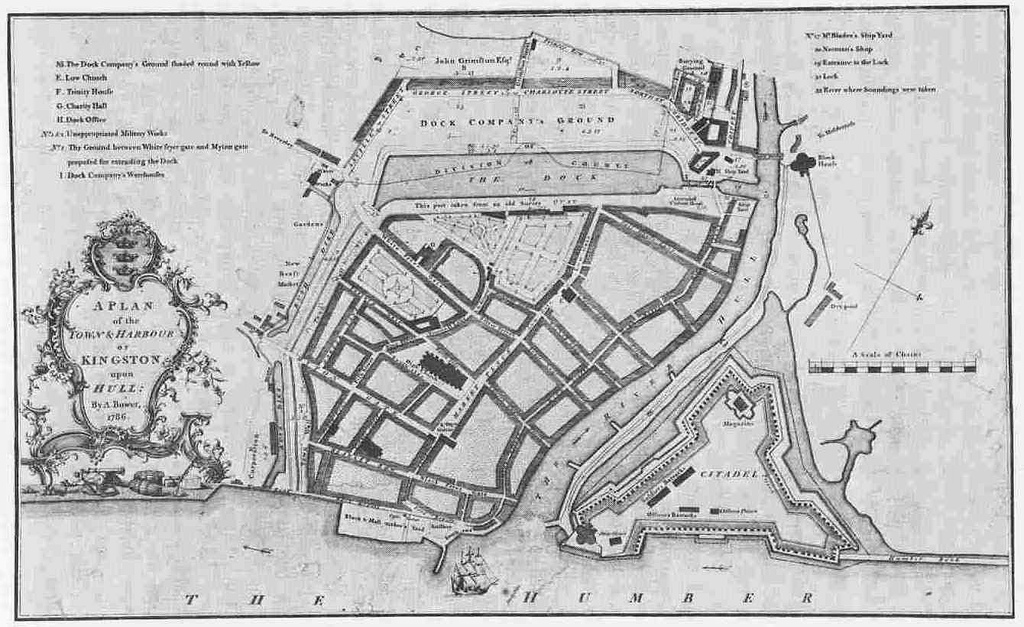
The town with Citadel in 1786. Also shown is the first town dock on the line of the north walls, and the western walls and Bush Dike. (survey by A. Bower)

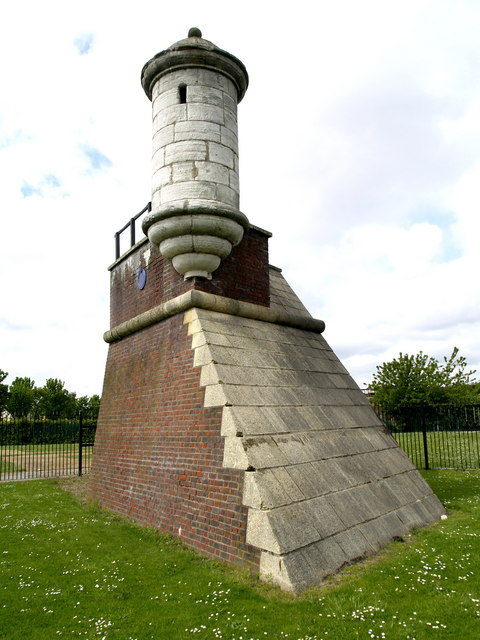
A Bartizan on the only surviving part of Hull Citadel

The Citadel was a result of extensive remodelling and civil engineering work on the former Hull Castle and South Blockhouse (1680s); a triangular artillery fort was created at the western bank of the Hull at its confluence with the Humber. Beckmann estimated the cost of the improvements at over £74,000 and eventually over £100,000 was expended on the works, 29 acres (0.12 km^{2}) was acquired by the Crown for the expanded work.

The new fortification extended onto the old village of Drypool, and part of that village had houses built to the north of the village church, outside the Citadel. The Citadel was an irregular triangular fort, with curtain walls of 100 (east), 266 (south) and 258 (west) yards with bastions at each apex, each with wall lengths of around 100 yards. The Castle and south blockhouse were retained and incorporated into the north and western bastions respectively. The structure was surrounded by a broad moat on the eastern and western sides.

Military use of the Citadel ended by 1848, and it was transferred to the 'Commissioners of Woods and Forests' in 1858, and rented out to commerce. The Citadel was sold in 1863, and in 1864 the site was cleared for industrial and dock use.

== The Sieges of Hull ==
In addition to actions during the Pilgrimage of Grace, and English Civil War, the town is said to have been briefly besieged around 1392 by enraged villagers from Cottingham and Anlaby, who objected to the construction of waterways from sources near their villages to supply Hull with fresh water. Around 1,000 persons threatened the town, as well as causing a nuisance in the countryside, and damaged the channels, but were ultimately unsuccessful and withdrew; the ringleaders are said to have been hanged at York, others pardoned.

=== Pilgrimage of Grace ===
During the northern English religious rebellion known as the Pilgrimage of Grace during which both York and Pontefract Castle were taken, a third force, commanded by the Stapletons besieged Hull; the town refused to join the rebellion when visited by envoys on 12 and 13 October 1536. The opposing force led by Ralph Ellerker, and John and William Constable capitulated after a five-day siege, and the rebel force (estimated at up to 6,000, probably 2,000–3,000 (Note: The value of 6,000 is thought to be an exaggeration, the number of persons in Stapleton's army is estimated at 2,000 to 3,000.)) took control of the town on 19/20 October 1536, installing John Hallam as governor; subsequently the monks and friars were reinstated in their respective monasteries and friaries. (Note: In "A History of Hull" (1980), Gillett and MacMahon, pp. 100–2, the roles of Hallam and Constable appear reversed in the description of the Sieges, the destruction of the Windmills at Beverleygates is also reversed from the 1537 to 1536 siege, Robert and either William or John Constable appear to be confused for each other. There are contradictions between other sources in the identity of the person who took the town by infiltration – either John Hallam or Robert Constable, and in the success of Hallam's infiltration of the town. Sheahan (1864) and others describes a successful infiltration by Robert Constable (and not Hallam), after the second siege in 1537 by Bygot, with the town in rebel hands for a month, then being captured by people of Hull in the middle of the night. The contradictions in the historical record are noted by Charles Spilman Todd, in "Incidents in the history of Kingston-upon-Hull..", (1869), pp.70–2, 88)

A truce was agreed between the rebels and the King (October/November 1536), during which time the King's position became much stronger. It is said this information reached Hull, and Hallam was expelled from the town by the emboldened Mayor (William Rogers), Alderman Eland, and a Mr. Knowles and other local people. However soon after (9 November) it was retaken, and garrisoned by forces under Robert Constable, with cannon installed in the harbour to prevent besieging from the sea. On 2 December the rebellion ended, with the King's pardon being proclaimed; the rebel forces dispersed, thinking that they had obtained the concessions they desired.

On 10 January 1537 the rebellion reignited, with Francis Bygot, (Note: Also written Bygod, Bigot, Bigod. See also Bigod's Rebellion) stating that the King's pardon was not good, and began to conspire with others including John Hallam. Hallam and others entered the town on market day in disguise, in an attempt to capture it from within, but had misjudged the mood of the town, and found support lacking; Hallam escaped, but then returned within the town gates in an attempt to rescue his colleagues, and was captured. Francis Bygot is recorded as having made an attempt to besiege the town in 1537; the rebels destroyed some windmills outside Beveleygates, but were unsuccessful in taking the town, and withdrew; whilst retreating they were attacked from the town by a party led by the Mayor, John Harrison, Ralph Ellerker and John Constable, with several killed or taken prisoner. Bygot is said to have captured Beverley, but was later captured.

Hallam was tried and hanged at Hull, and in May 1537 Robert Constable was found guilty of treason, and hanged in Hull; his body was hung in chains from Beverley Gate.

On Frydaye, beyng market daye at Hull, Sir Robert Constable suifred, and dothe hang above the highest gate of the towne, so trymmed in cheynes, as this berer can shewe you, and I think his boones will hang there this hundrethe yere.

— Duke of Norfolk, 8 July 1537, letter to Cromwell

=== English Civil War ===
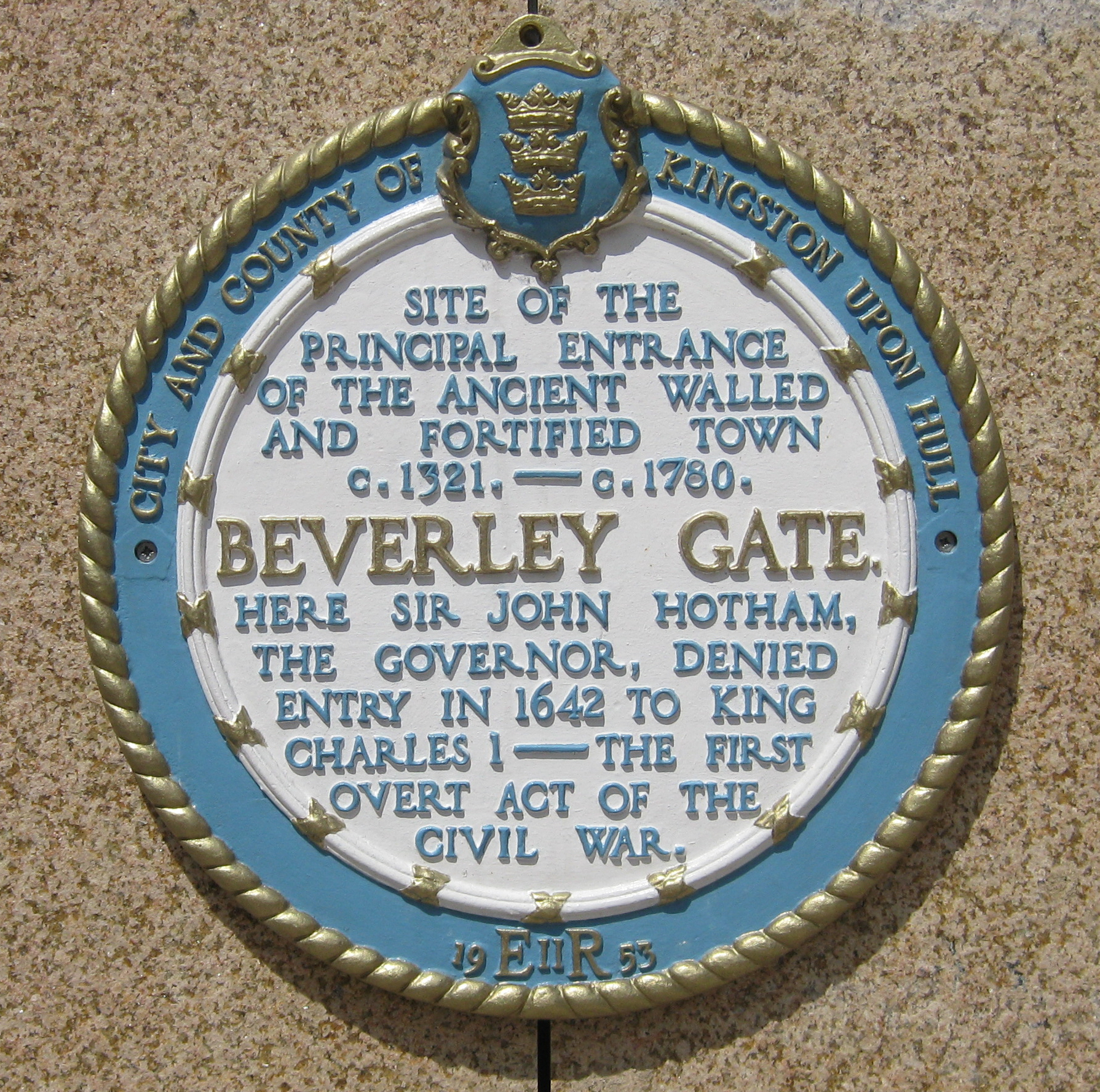
Plaque by the foundations of the Beverley Gate

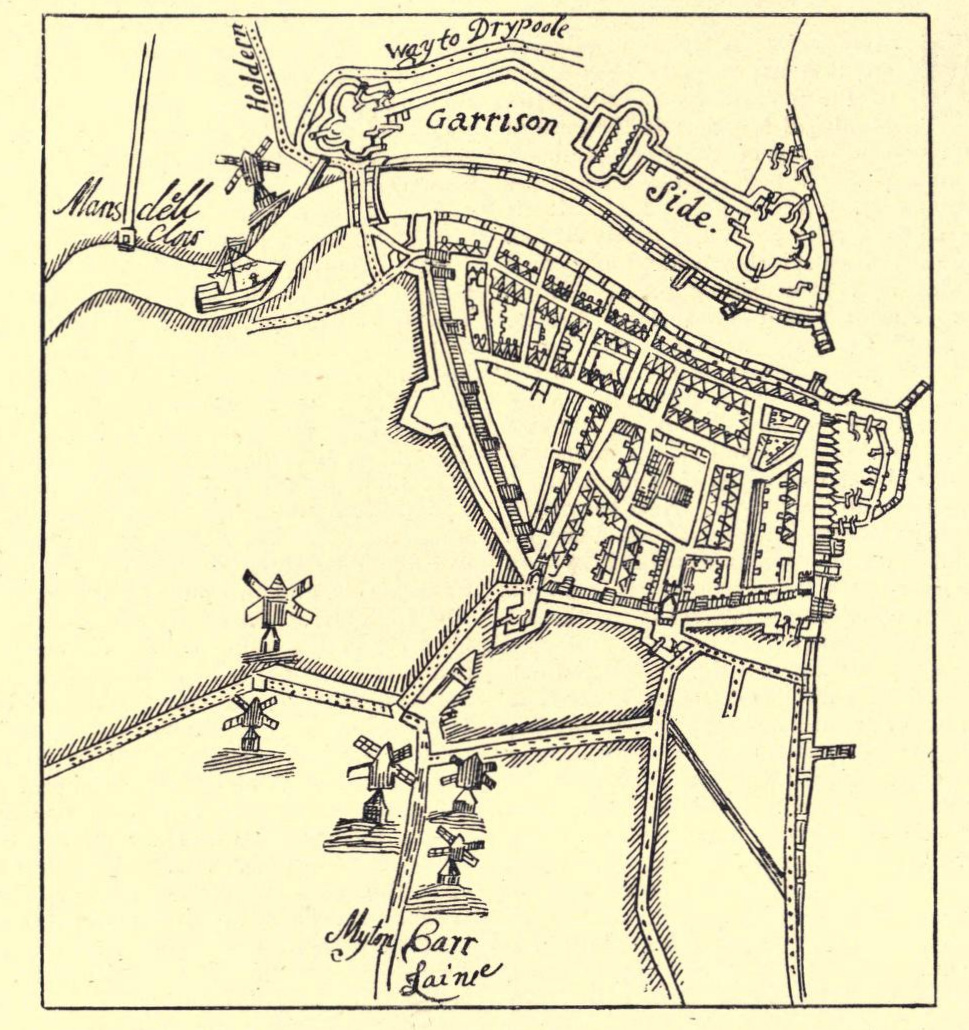
1668 map of Hull showing additional hornwork added outside city walls during the civil war period. (Up is east)

In 1638 at the beginning of the period known as the Wars of the Three Kingdoms, during the buildup before the 1639 war with Scotland (First Bishops' War) agents acting on behalf of the King (Charles I) visited the town to inspect its defence; all but the three main gates were to be closed and in 1639 it was reported that the town could be defended by 1,000 men. Charles I was welcomed into Hull to inspect the fortifications and arsenal in 1639. In April 1642 the King returned to Hull to secure the arsenal at Hull, but was refused admittance at Beverley Gate by John Hotham.

In July Charles I established his court in Beverley and the siege of Hull began. Dikes were cut around Hull preventing besieging forces becoming established outside the walls, and the Charterhouse was demolished to prevent it being used for the defence of any besieging forces, both Hessle and Myton Gates were closed and blocked, and additional artillery batteries set up outside Beverley, Myton and North gates. Skirmishes and artillery exchanges took place outside the walls, additionally there were unsuccessful plots to blow up the gates to admit Royalist forces. A successful skirmish by the Parliamentarians on the Royalist headquarters in Anlaby resulted in the raising of the siege.

On 2 September 1643, a second siege of Hull began, with Thomas Fairfax ensconced as commander of the garrison, and the royalist Earl of Newcastle besieging. At this time the ruins of the Charterhouse outside the north walls on the west bank were turned into an artillery fort. After unsuccessful attacks on the royalist position at Anlaby the land around Hull was flooded again, preventing besieging attack. The north Blockhouse of the Castle was accidentally blown up by its own gunpowder store on 16 September. Fighting continued outside the walls in September, with royalists temporarily taking control of the defences at Hessle Gate and Charterhouse, before being forced to withdraw. On 11 October 1643 1,500 men fought a seven-hour battle outside the walls, captured the royalist positions and relieved the siege.

== See also ==
- Fortifications of Portsmouth, Tilbury Fort, Sheerness; forts expanded at the same time as the construction of Hull Citadel (late 17th century)
- Fort Paull, coastal artillery fort at Paull downstream on the banks of the Humber Estuary
- Humber Forts, early 20th century fortifications in the Humber Estuary mouth
