= Charterhouse, Kingston upon Hull =

Building in Kingston upon Hull, England

Charterhouse
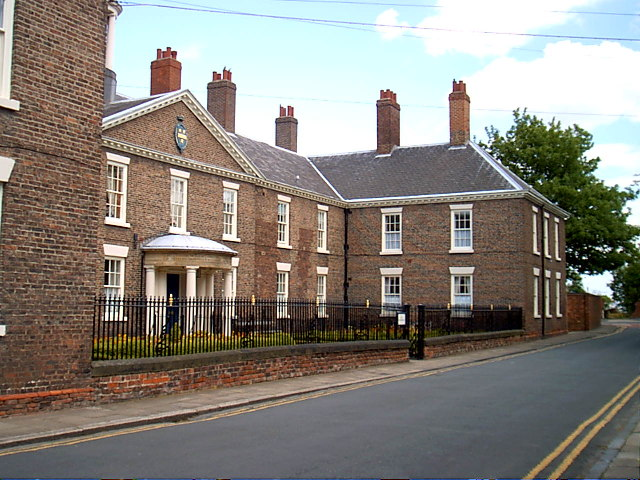
- The Charterhouse (built c. 1780)
- Interactive map of Charterhouse

Monastery information
- Full name: Hull Charterhouse
- Order: Carthusian
- Established: 1377
- Disestablished: 1538
- Dedication: Saint Michael

Site
- Location: Kingston upon Hull, England

The Charterhouse (Hull Charterhouse) was a Carthusian monastery and almshouse in Kingston upon Hull, England, built just outside the town's walls. The hospital building survived the Dissolution of the Monasteries; the priory was destroyed in 1538. The structure of the hospital was destroyed before the first siege of Hull during the English Civil War. A replacement was built in 1645, which was replaced again in 1780; the buildings function as an almshouse with an attached chapel, and remain in use to the present day (2012).

The 1.65 hectares (4.1 acres) area around and including the Charterhouse was designated a conservation area in 1975, which includes a Victorian board school – Charterhouse School – and an 18th-century burial ground.

== History ==
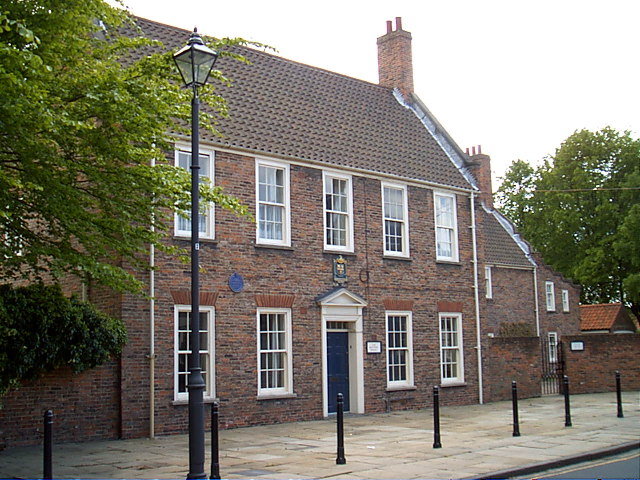
The Master's House, built c. 1780

According to Tickell in The History of the Town and County of Kingston Upon Hull (1796), there was a religious house at the Charterhouse site from the time of Edward I.

It is certain that the land became the property of William de la Pole in the 14th century. He established a hospital there, known as the Maison Dieu, around 1350. According to the Chronicle of Melsa, during William's life there was at one time a community of thirteen men and two women living there, as well as a college of six priests; as a result of conflict within and without the community they were removed, and later the Friars Minor occupied the place. William had acquired a license from Edward III to establish a monastery there, and intended to found one for the Poor Clares, but died before it could be completed. His son, Michael de la Pole, completed the foundation of a monastery in 1377, dedicated to Saint Michael, to house thirteen monks of the Carthusian Order. William, Duke of Suffolk (great-grandson of William the founder) was buried here by his widow, Alice Chaucer, as was his wish, this being their family church (and not in the Wingfield church as is sometimes stated).

The monastery income in 1535 was over £230, with a net income of £174 18s 3d, but was not dissolved by the Dissolution of the Lesser Monasteries Act, and received license to continued from the King. It was suppressed in 1538, and the priory was destroyed. The hospital had been rendered to the crown in 1506 on account of the actions of Edmund de la Pole, 3rd Duke of Suffolk, but was restored in 1553 to the mayor and burgesses of Hull. The hospital became known as the Charterhouse after the former priory.

In the English Civil War the hospital building was demolished, before the First Siege of Hull (1642), to prevent it being used by besieging forces. It was rebuilt in 1645 at a cost of £474; further cells and a chapel were built from 1663 to 1673. It was rebuilt again in 1780, and extended in 1803. By the 1860s the hospital cared for 70 pensioners, each with an allowance of 6s per week.

The Master's House is thought to incorporate part of the 1650 hospital, it was damaged during the Second World War, and restored in 1950. Both the Charterhouse and Master's House are listed buildings.

As of 2002 the Charterhouse still functioned as an almshouse.

== Notable staff ==
Henrietta Whiteford RRC, (1864–1934) was Matron of the Almshouses from 1910– until at least 1919. She trained at The London Hospital under Eva Luckes between 1889–1891. Whiteford worked with British Nurses in Crete, during the Greco-Turkish War, April – May 1897, for which she was awarded the Commemorative Medal and Diploma of the Red Cross from Olga, Queen of the Hellenes. From October 1897 she nursed in the Maidstone Typhoid Epidemic. From 1900–1909 she worked in Princess Christian's Army Nursing Service and served in the Second Anglo Boer War. During the First World War Whiteford was given leave of absence and served in Queen Alexandra's Imperial Military Nursing Service (Reserve) between 1914–1919. She was awarded the Royal Red Cross in 1916.

== Charterhouse School ==
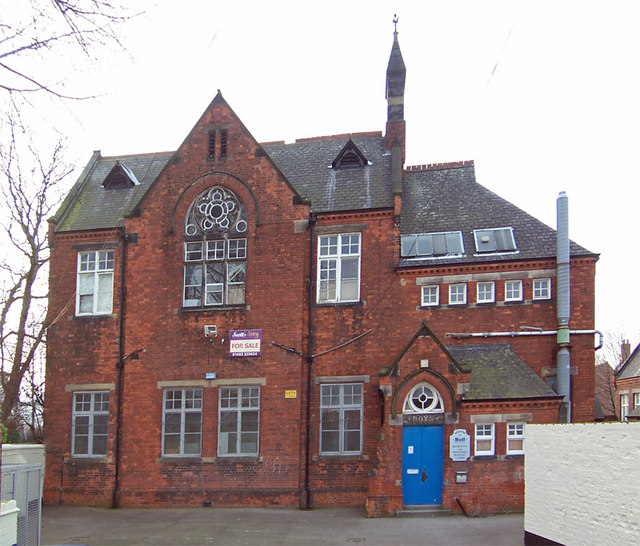
Charterhouse School, Kingston upon Hull (mixed school building)

The nearby Charterhouse School to the east of the present Charterhouse is a Victorian development – a board school designed by William Botterill, built in 1881. The school consists of a single-storey infants' school, and a two-storey segregated school, with separate boys' and girls' entrances; the girls' classrooms were on the first floor. It became a secondary school in 1950.

In 1967 the school became an annexe of Hull College. By 2015, the site had been sold by the college.
