= Jonas Moore (surveyor, died 1682) =

English surveyor

Sir Jonas Moore (died 12 July 1682) was an English surveyor.

He was the only son of Jonas Moore (died 1679), who he succeeded as Surveyor-General of the Ordnance. He was knighted on 9 August 1680, but died two years later as a result of falling off a horse. He was buried beside his father in the Church of St Peter ad Vincula in the Tower of London.
