= James Murray Hadden =

Major-General James Murray Hadden (baptised 23 January 1757 – 29 October 1817) was a British Army officer and surveyor-general of the ordnance.

== Biography ==
A son of Captain John Hadden of the Royal Marines, he entered the Royal Military Academy, Woolwich, as a cadet, 2 April 1771, and was appointed a second lieutenant in the 2nd battalion Royal Artillery in 1776. His subsequent commissions were: first lieutenant, 7 July 1779; captain-lieutenant, 21 November 1783; captain, 17 January 1793: brevet-major, 1 March 1794; brevet-lieutenant-colonel, 1 January 1798; regimental major, 1 August 1800; regimental lieutenant-colonel, 27 May 1801; colonel, 1 June 1806; major-general, 4 June 1811.

Hadden embarked for Quebec 4 May 1776, arrived there 12 July, and in the following October commanded a gunboat in the operations of the American War of Independence on Lake Champlain. He commanded a detachment of two guns with John Burgoyne's army the year after, and was wounded in the battle of Freeman's Farm, 19 September 1777. He was among the prisoners at the battle of Saratoga, but was exchanged before 1781. He then served as one of the artillery officers of Henry Clinton's force.

After the war, Hadden was appointed adjutant of the 1st battalion at Woolwich in 1783, and in 1793 was one of the officers specially selected for command of the new troops of Royal Horse Artillery. His troop, the old D troop, was raised in 1793, and disbanded in 1816. In 1797 he was appointed adjutant-general of the British troops in Portugal. He was secretary to the Charles Lennox, 3rd Duke of Richmond when he was master-general of the ordnance in 1794-5, and was surveyor-general of the ordnance from 1804 to 1810.

Hadden, who was married and left a family, died at Harpenden, Hertfordshire.

== Works ==
A manuscript journal kept by Hadden in America, from 4 March 1776 to the battle of Freeman's Farm, and eight manuscript order-books of the Royal Artillery for 1776-8, all of which after Hadden's death were at one time in possession of William Cobbett, were purchased some years ago by Henry Stevens on behalf of an American publishing house. They were printed at Albany, New York, in 1884, with annotations by Brevet-brigadier-general Horatio Rogers, United States volunteers, as volume xii. of Munsell's Historical Series.

== Notes ==
Attribution

This article incorporates text from a publication now in the public domain: Stephen, Leslie; Lee, Sidney, eds. (1890). "Hadden, James Murray". Dictionary of National Biography. Vol. 23. London: Smith, Elder & Co.
