= Jonas Moore =

English mathematician and engineer (1627–1679)

Sir Jonas Moore FRS
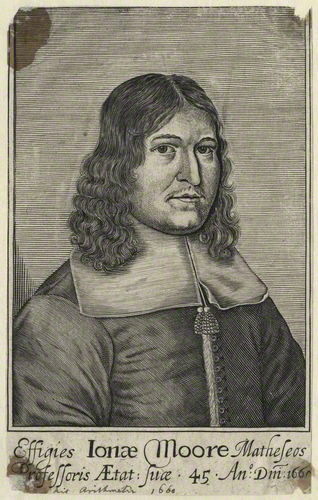
- Engraved portrait of Moore by an unknown artist
- Born: 1617; Higham, Lancashire
- Died: 27 August 1679; Godalming, Surrey
- Awards: Fellow of the Royal Society
- Scientific career
- Fields: mathematician, surveyor
- Workplaces: East Anglia; Royal Observatory, Greenwich

Sir Jonas Moore, FRS (1617–1679) was an English mathematician, surveyor, ordnance officer, and patron of astronomy. He took part in two of the most ambitious English civil engineering projects of the 17th century: draining the Great Level of the Fens and building the Mole at Tangier. In later life, his wealth and influence as Surveyor-General of the Ordnance enabled him to become a patron and driving force behind the establishment of the Royal Observatory, Greenwich.

== Origins and early career ==
Jonas Moore was born at Higher White Lee, in Higham, which is in Pendle, Lancashire on 8 February 1617, a son of a yeoman farmer, John Moore. His older brother, also John, had allegedly been bewitched to death in about 1610 by Elizabeth Sothernes (Old Demdike), the most notorious of the Pendle witches. There is no record of Jonas's education but it is likely that he attended Burnley Grammar School, which was only three miles from his home. In 1637, he was appointed clerk to Thomas Burwell, Vicar-General of the diocese of Durham, a job requiring competence in the use of legal Latin. He married Eleanor Wren on 8 April 1638 in Durham, and subsequently raised a family of a son and two daughters. During the English Civil War, Parliament sequestered church revenues in October 1642, and Moore with no income had to return to Lancashire.

== Mathematician and surveyor ==
Records of Moore's life during the next ten years are sketchy, but by 1650 he was an established mathematics teacher and published his first book, Moores Arithmetick. In 1674 (This date cannot be right as Moore was dead 5 years later), Sir Jonas Moore first used the abbreviated notation 'cos' for the trigonometric term cosine. He went on that year to be appointed Surveyor to the Fen drainage Company of William Russell, 5th Earl of Bedford, and worked on draining the Fens for the next seven years. In 1658, Moore was able to produce a 16-sheet Mapp of the Great Levell of the Fens, which provided an effective means of displaying the Company's achievements in altering the Fenland landscape of East Anglia. The scale of the map (about two inches to the mile) was not to be bettered until the late 19th century.

In the early 1660s, Moore worked mainly as a surveyor, mapping the River Thames from "Westminster to the sea" in 1662, his first commission from a government body. From 1663, James, Duke of York became Moore's chief patron. In June, Moore visited Tangier (an English possession from 1661 to 1684) as part of a team to design a stone pier. During this time, he used an experimental sounding device provided by Robert Hooke to assist him in his project. On his return, he prepared a map with the title A Mapp of the Citty of Tanger with Straits of Gibraltar. Described by Jonas Moore Surveyor to his Royall Highness the Duke of York. When it was completed in March 1664, Samuel Pepys, an active member of the Tangiers Committee, was impressed with the map "which is very pleasant, and I purpose to have it finely set out and hung up."

== Ordnance officer ==
With the patronage of the King's brother, Moore found a place as a member of the Ordnance Office. He was appointed Assistant Surveyor of the Ordnance on 19 June 1665 as full deputy to Francis Nicholls, who had been Surveyor since 1660. Moore became Surveyor-General of the Ordnance after the death of Nicholls on 28 July 1669.

The Surveyor's duties were not confined to land surveying; rather the main duty was to ensure availability of adequate stores, particularly guns and ammunition. During the Third Anglo-Dutch War, Moore met Prince Rupert at The Nore (off the Thames Estuary) with 16 vessels loaded with powder and shot. He received his knighthood on 28 January 1673, probably as a reward for his duties during the first year of the Third Dutch War. With the end of the war in 1674, Moore was able to pursue his interest in astronomy and attempted to gain support from the Royal Society for an observatory at Chelsea College. Moore was elected to the Royal Society on 3 December 1674, but the proposal for an observatory at Chelsea came to nothing. He continued as an active member, and in May 1676 he was appointed a Vice-President of the Royal Society.

When Charles II appointed John Flamsteed his "astronomical observator" on 4 March 1675, Flamsteed had already enjoyed Moore's patronage since 1670, when Moore presented him with a Towneley micrometer. The Ordnance Office was responsible for the building of the Royal Observatory at Greenwich, which was completed in June 1676. Moore provided much of the Observatory's foundation equipment including the two "Great Clocks" by Thomas Tompion, out of his own pocket.

== Death and after ==
Towards the end of his life, Moore took a great interest in the Royal Mathematical School at Christ's Hospital in London and he was made a governor in December 1676. In 1677, Moore began to write a book, to be called A New Systeme of the Mathematicks, with the purpose of defining a mathematical course suitable for the school. It was unfinished when Moore died on 27 August 1679.

He was succeeded as Surveyor General of the Ordnance by his only son, also Jonas. Jonas junior died in 1682 and so it was the husbands of Moore's two daughters, rather than the son, who undertook the publication of the "New Systeme", which with the final parts being written by John Flamsteed and Edmond Halley, was completed in 1681. Despite his family's alleged adverse involvement with the Pendle Witches, he was one of the sponsors of a book by Dr John Webster entitled The Displaying of Supposed Witchcraft, which exposed the fallacies of the belief in witchcraft and played a large part in the cessation of prosecutions for witchcraft.

Both Sir Jonas Moore and his son were buried in the Church of St Peter ad Vincula in the Tower of London.

== Contemporaries ==
John Aubrey's biography of Moore, written a year or two after his death, characterised him as "a good mathematician and a good fellowe", that is a man given to drink every day wine with company. Among such company would be Samuel Pepys, who recorded one such session in the Rhenish wine house on 23 May 1661 "...and there came Jonas Moore, the mathematician, to us, and there he did by discourse make us fully believe that England and France were once the same continent, by very good arguments, and spoke very many things, not so much to prove the Scripture false as that the time therein is not well computed nor understood." Only a casual acquaintance in the 1660s, Pepys counted him "my Worthy Friend" when both were governors of the Mathematics School.

Two of Moore's friends, Sir Christopher Wren and Robert Hooke, were also associated with the Royal Observatory. By 1670, Moore had become a close friend of Hooke's; Moore and Hooke were among a small group that met at Wren's house as the "New Philosophicall Club" in 1676, at a time when the public's opinion of philosophers and the Royal Society was at a low ebb. Moore always looked for tangible results from Flamsteed's work at Greenwich: in July 1678, Moore threatened to stop Flamsteed's salary and compared his lack of published results unfavourably with the recent work by Edmond Halley.
