= Siege of Hull (1642) =

First major action of the English Civil War 1642

Coordinates: 53.744°N 0.332°W

- Part of the First English Civil War
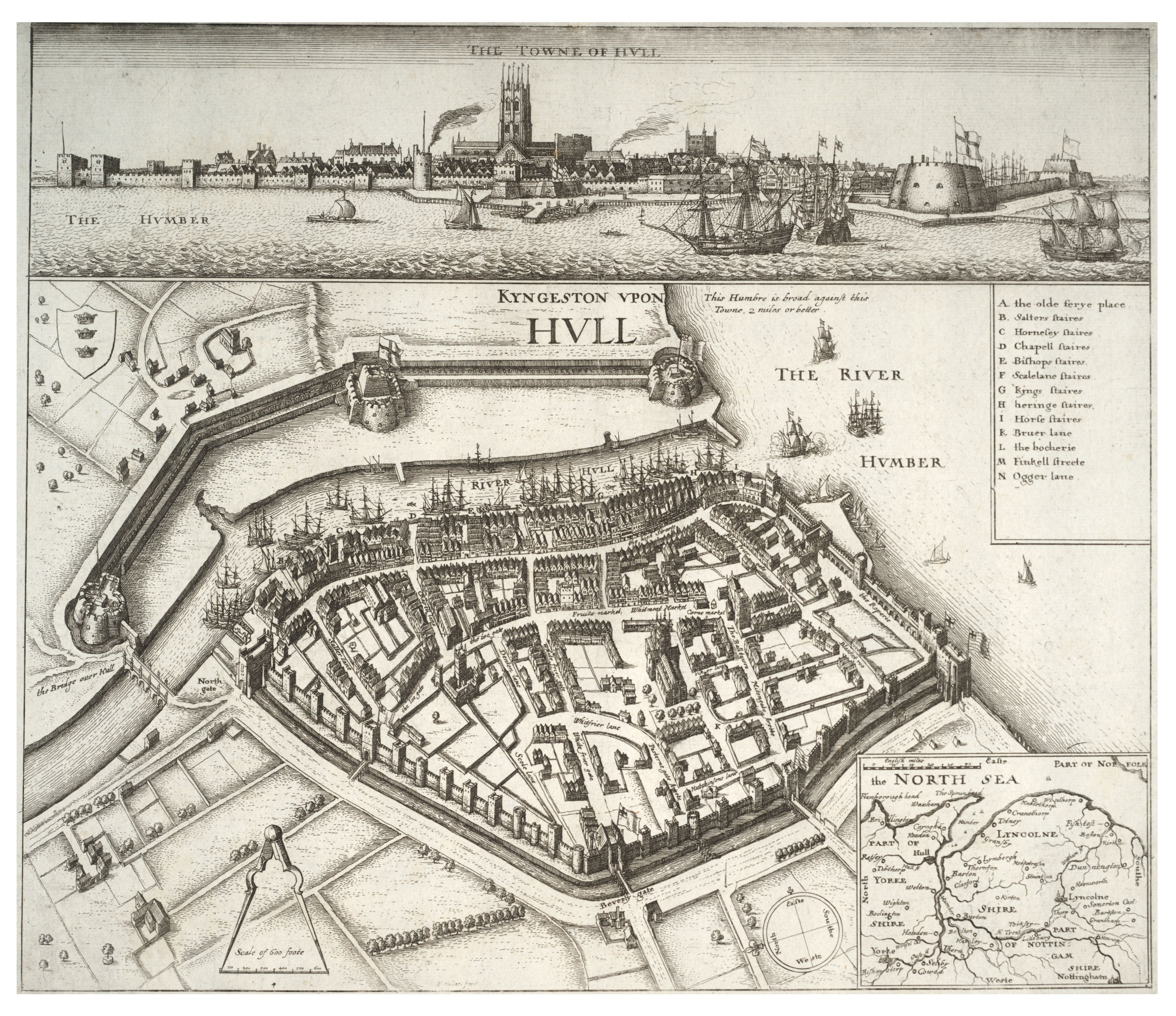
- A map of Hull from c. 1640
Date	10–27 July 1642
Location	Hull, England
Result	Parliamentarian victory

Belligerents
Royalists	Parliamentarians

Commanders and leaders
Charles I; Earl of Lindsey	Sir John Hotham; Sir John Meldrum

Strength
3,000 infantry; 1,000 cavalry	1,500 soldiers

The first siege of Hull marked an escalation in the conflict between King Charles I and Parliament during the preliminaries of the First English Civil War. Charles sought to secure the large arsenal held in Kingston upon Hull, East Riding of Yorkshire. He first approached the town in late April 1642 and was rebuffed by the town's Parliamentarian governor, Sir John Hotham. Charles retreated to York but in July he received news that Hotham might be willing to hand over the town if the Royalists approached with force large enough for Hotham to surrender with his honour intact.

Charles marched towards the town with 4,000 men. Hull had been reinforced by sea and Parliament had sent Sir John Meldrum to command the garrison, as they were concerned about Hotham's loyalty. Hotham once again rejected the King's demands to enter the town and a largely ineffective siege was established by the Royalists, commanded by the Earl of Lindsey as the King had returned to York. Meldrum led several sallies from the town and after a particularly effective one on 27 July, which destroyed a Royalist magazine to the west of the town, Lindsey lifted the siege and withdrew the King's forces to York.

== Background ==
Northern England; key locations 1642

In 1642, disagreements between the English Parliament and its monarch on religious, fiscal and legislative matters had lasted for over half a century. At the beginning of January that year, King Charles unsuccessfully attempted to arrest five Members of Parliament (MPs) who were opposing him. Having failed, and realising that Parliament had more support in London than he did, Charles fled the capital, and both sides began preparing for war.

=== Hull ===
In the 17th century, Kingston upon Hull, or Hull, was the second largest town in Yorkshire; with a population of 7,000, only the northern capital of York was bigger. Access to the North Sea meant it was the primary export point for manufactured goods produced in Northern England; while its position at the confluence of the Hull and Humber rivers also made it the centre of an inland trade route. In his military history of Yorkshire, David Cooke called it "a very important town", while the Victoria County History described it as "strategically important". Its arms magazine in Lowgate was the second largest in England after the Tower of London; in 1642, it contained 120 artillery pieces, 7,000 barrels of powder, and weapons for 16,000 to 20,000 men.

The town's position made it naturally very defensible. It had been fortified in the fourteenth century, and these defences had been enhanced since. By the 1630s, Hull was enclosed by walls; on the west bank of the River Hull, on which the town sat, medieval walls fronted by a ditch and interspersed with 25 towers were located on all but the river-side of the town. On the east bank, a three-metre-thick (9.8 ft) curtain wall featuring three blockhouses had been erected during the reign of Henry VIII (r. 1509–1547).

In preparation for the Bishops' Wars, further improvements were made to the defences: the ditch was cleaned out and an additional ditch dug. Between the two ditches batteries were installed near the gates and breastworks connected them to create a new outer perimeter. Drawbridges were installed at Beverley Gate and North Gate, and the town was supplied with additional artillery. Sluice gates were also placed on the two rivers to enable the garrison to flood low-lying land surrounding the town. The historian Andrew Hopper described Hull as being "arguably the strongest fortress town in England". Unlike most of Yorkshire, which had a mix of MPs favouring Parliament or the King, Hull and the surrounding East Riding of Yorkshire had returned exclusively Parliament-favouring members. The area was also religiously opposed to the King, having a strong Puritan population. Within Hull, MPs were typically chosen for their willingness to stand-up for the town, rather than any underlying political or religious beliefs, as the town's corporation was interested in maintaining its own interests in the town without external influence.

=== Sir John Hotham ===
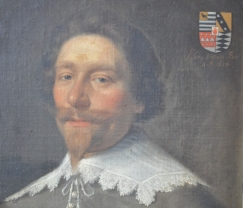
Sir John Hotham

Sir John Hotham fought in the Palatinate campaign of the Thirty Years' War in the early part of the seventeenth century, before later being returned as a Member of Parliament for Beverley in the East Riding. He was a favourite of Thomas Wentworth, who appointed him governor of Hull in 1628. Hotham opposed both the King and Wentworth during the Bishops' Wars, and was replaced as governor in 1639. The following year he withheld reinforcements from Wentworth, for which he was stripped of more of his positions. Hotham was renowned for being easily offended, and was described by Sir Hugh Cholmeley as often letting his emotions overcome his better judgement. He felt slighted by the loss of his commissions, and turned into a political opponent of the King in Parliament, where he became one of the most vocal members.

== Prelude ==
Due to the large arsenal in Hull, both sides were eager to gain control of the town. On 11 January, Charles appointed the Earl of Newcastle as the governor of Hull and commanded him to take and hold the town for the Royalist cause. Around the same time, Hotham was given the same position and orders by Parliament. Newcastle arrived at Hull on 15 January with letters from the King offering pardons to the townspeople and ordering them to allow him access to the magazine. Wary of the reception he might receive, he initially attempted to gain entry under the pseudonym of "Sir John Savage", but was recognised and forced to reveal his true identity. Lacking military might or local influence, Newcastle was unable to gain entry and sent a message to the King saying "the town will not admit me by any means, so I am very flat and out of countenance here". Hotham's son, Captain John Hotham, an MP for Scarborough, arrived outside Hull three days later, backed by around 300 of his father's militia. Captain Hotham was also refused entry to the town, but after threatening to report them to Parliament, he spread rumours that local Catholics and the Spanish were planning to attack the town, and was finally allowed entry under emergency terms.

Despite the manoeuvrings between the King and Parliament, there remained an illusion that the two sides were still governing the country together. This illusion ended when Charles moved north, fearing that he would be captured if he remained in the south of England. He arrived in York, roughly 35 miles (56 km) north-west of Hull, on 18 March. Around the same time, Sir John Hotham arrived in Hull to assume governorship of the town, and was given orders from Parliament "not to admit any forces into Hull without orders from both houses of Parliament". The garrison was increased to roughly 1,000 soldiers but despite this, Parliament was wary about the proximity of the King's forces and ordered that the town's magazine should be transported to London.

=== King Charles demands entry ===
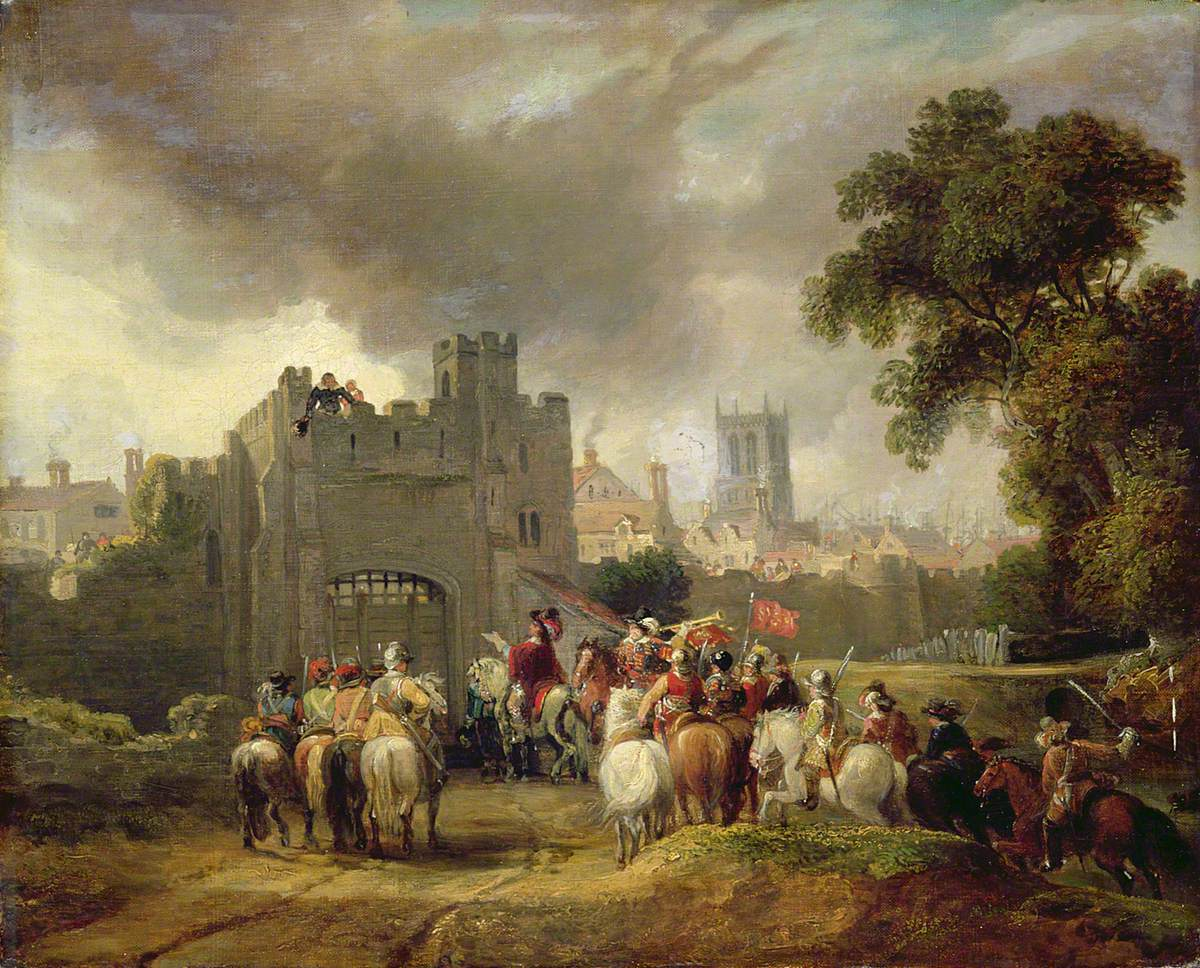
A 19th-century painting, depicting King Charles I demanding entrance to Hull.

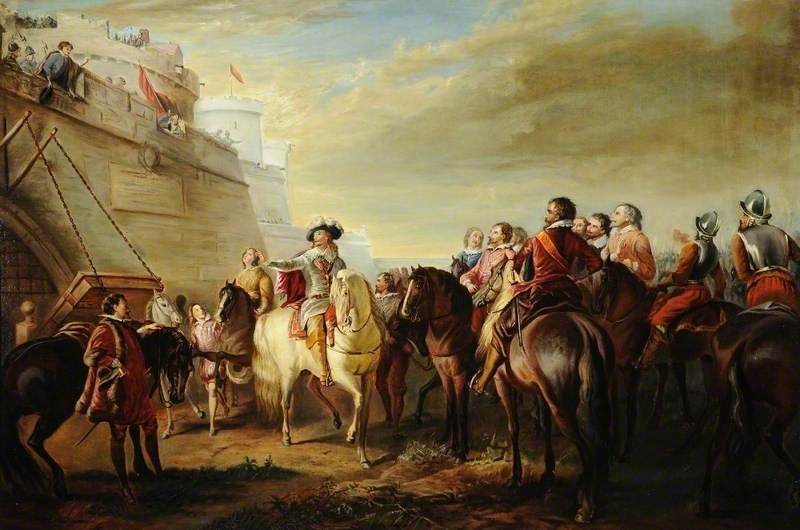
Charles I before Hull by Joseph Parrocel, oil on canvas, held at the Guildhall (date unknown)

Eager to capture the magazine before it could be moved to London, Charles rode towards Hull. He sent a small retinue ahead, consisting of his eight-year-old son—the Duke of York (later King James II of England)—and his nephew—the deposed Elector Palatine Charles Louis—along with some members of the nobility and fifty men. The group were admitted into the town on 22 April, and hosted by the town's mayor and aldermen. Charles Louis told the mayor that they planned to meet the King on his way to the town the next day. Accordingly, on the next morning, Sir Lewis Dyve arrived at the gates and announced that King Charles intended to dine in the town that day. Hotham held a meeting with the town's leaders and they resolved not to allow Charles to enter Hull and secured the town gates and lifted the drawbridges.

Charles approached Beverley Gate on the morning of 23 April, accompanied by many local nobles, the Earl of Montrose, the Earl of Lindsey, Prince Rupert of the Rhine and a large army from the local trained bands. The King's heralds announced his arrival and then demanded that he be allowed entry to the town and the magazine, on the basis that it was property of the Crown. Hotham stood on top of the low wall next to the gate and announced that despite his loyalty to the King, he could not allow the King and his army to enter the town without breaking the trust placed in him by Parliament. Doing so, he explained, would label him "the odious name of villain and faith-breaker". He offered to allow the King entry with a small escort of twelve men but when the King demanded thirty, Hotham demurred, worried that it could rouse Royalist sympathisers in the town. The two sides continued to dispute matters until the early evening, during which time Hotham agreed to provide food for the King, which he had lowered from the town walls. Frustrated, the King declared Hotham a traitor and suggested that he should be thrown from the walls by the townspeople but the declaration had no effect and the Royalists withdrew to Beverley.

Parliament responded to the King's charge of treason by stating that Hotham had only been following their orders and that the King had breached Parliamentary privilege by branding Hotham a traitor. This declaration from Parliament brought Hotham to national attention; as was typical during the civil war, Parliament celebrated its victory over the King by publishing propaganda. A speech made by Hotham on 23 May, in which he justified his actions in defying Charles, was published in pamphlet form and for a time those that favoured Parliament were known as 'Hothamites'. In response, a cartoon picture was published suggesting that Hotham felt he was superior to the King: Parliament ordered the picture to be ceremonially burned.

Hotham was worried about the prospect of unrest and rebellion within Hull. At the end of April, Parliament announced that should he be killed his son would replace him as governor. To try and prevent desertions, he spread rumours that the King had ordered any soldiers caught outside the town walls to be killed. By the end of May, in response to demands from Hotham that others "share in his dangers and responsibilities", Parliament sent Sir William Airmyn, Sir William Strickland, John Alured, Michael Warton, Henry Darley and Peregrine Pelham to Hull with Captain Hotham. During May, Parliament had also transported the majority of the weapons from Hull on four boats; around three-quarters of what had been housed in the town arrived in London on 30 May.

== Siege ==
After rebuffing the King in April, Hotham had to put down several plots from within Hull to betray the town. In his account of the Civil War, the Earl of Clarendon suggested that Hotham was meanwhile planning to hand the town over to the King himself. Lord Digby had been captured by a Parliamentarian ship, but pretended to be a Frenchman who did not speak English. He was taken to Hull, where he met with Hotham and admitted his true identity. Digby tried to persuade Hotham to surrender Hull to the King. The two agreed that if the King approached the town with a sufficient force, then Hotham could make a show of resisting, before honourably surrendering the town. Digby travelled to York, still disguised as a Frenchman and informed Charles of the plan.

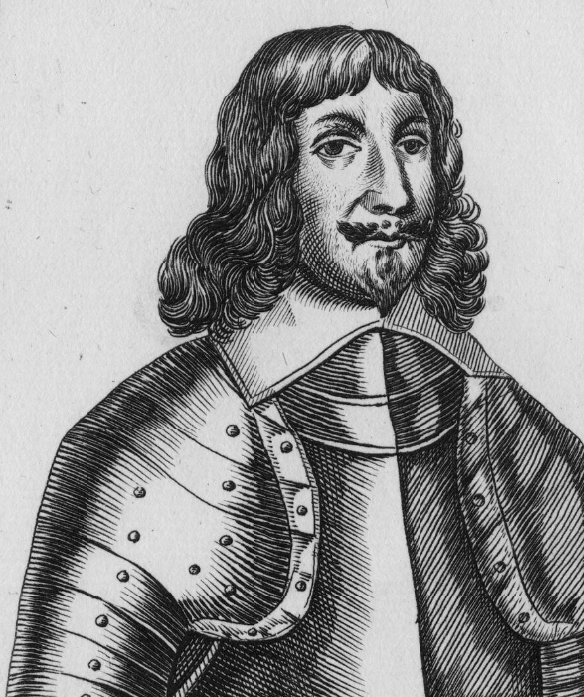
Sir John Meldrum was sent by Parliament to both assist Hotham, and ensure his loyalty.

On 3 July, Charles marched from York with 3,000 infantry and 1,000 cavalry. On arrival, rather than admitting the King as agreed, Hotham held fast against the King's demands to enter. Hull defences had been further improved, and the poorly trained and equipped army the King had brought was insufficient to storm the town. Charles had contemplated trying to blockade Hull, but had been told by Thomas Glemham, a former governor, that the town was so low-lying that surface water was easily accessible, and Parliament's control of the navy meant that it could be easily replenished by sea. Parliament sent further reinforcements (recorded as between 500 and 1,500) which arrived by sea on 10 July, led by Sir John Meldrum. In addition to supplementing the garrison, Meldrum had been sent by Parliament to command the garrison, as they doubted Hotham's loyalty. To make the town more defensible, Hotham ordered the sluice gates be opened, and that the banks of the Humber should be breached to allow the high spring tide to flood the land around the town. He also had buildings beyond the town walls destroyed to remove any cover the King's army could use during an attack; this included the Carthusian hospital building to the north and the village of Myton to the west.

Though Parliament controlled the navy, the Royalists did manage to send one ship up the river Humber as far as Keyingham, 10 miles (16 km) east of Hull, where they unloaded eight artillery pieces which they then transported across land to establish a battery on the eastern side of the town. Forts were also established in Paull, Hessle and on the southern bank of the Humber, to fire at ships using the river. The siege of Hull is variously described as commencing from either 10 July or 15 July and a sally made by Meldrum is often attributed as the "first blood" of the First English Civil War. According to John Rushworth, Meldrum attacked the King's forces with 500 men. The Royalist cavalry were not backed up by their infantry, and in the face of the attack retreated towards Beverley. Meldrum's force gave chase, killing two and capturing thirty. At this early stage of the war, siege warfare in Britain was largely ineffective; methods that had been developed and refined in the European wars were applied without the skill and experience required. Charles, having been frustrated in his efforts to capture the town, withdrew from Hull, leaving the Earl of Lindsey in command of his forces. (Note: In his histories, David Cooke lists command passing instead to the Earl of Newport, but the majority of sources list it being given to Lindsey.) Another sortie by Meldrum on 27 July attacked the Royalist arsenal in Anlaby, to the west of Hull, capturing fifteen cannon and a 36-pound (16 kg) mortar. After this loss, the Royalists lifted the siege and retreated to York.

== Aftermath ==
Less than four weeks after retreating from Hull, on 22 August 1642, Charles I raised his royal standard at Nottingham. He declared the Earl of Essex, and by extension Parliament, to be traitors, marking the formal start of the First English Civil War. Securing Hull and its arsenal ensured the Parliamentarian army began the war better equipped than their opponents and is viewed by the historian I. E. Ryder as "one of the pivotal actions" for the first year of the conflict. In September 1642, Ferdinando Fairfax, Lord Fairfax signed a non-aggression pact with local Royalists in an attempt to maintain peace in Yorkshire. Hotham disagreed with the move, and after making strong declarations against the pact, he broke it by attacking Selby and Cawood Castle in early October, after which the Royalists retaliated by attacking Fairfax's headquarters in Bradford. Hotham's doubts about defying the King remained; fuelled by his disagreements with Fairfax, Hotham tried to negotiate a defection with the Earl of Newcastle. Captain Hotham was arrested for disloyalty by Oliver Cromwell in June 1643 but managed to escape. Concerned that both father and son were going to defect, Parliament ordered Matthew Boynton to take control of Hull, which he did on 29 June. Hotham escaped to Beverley, where he was captured and taken to London. Both Hothams were sent to the Tower of London as prisoners, tried and sentenced to death. Despite reprieves and a vote in the House of Commons, they were executed at the end of January 1645.

During 1642, the Parliamentarians had the upper hand in the East Riding of Yorkshire, but they suffered territorial losses early the following year, and by June they only held a few towns in the area, including Hull. In August, a Royalist army of 16,000 men commanded by the Earl of Newcastle captured Beverley, forcing Sir Thomas Fairfax, the son of Lord Fairfax, to retreat to Hull. The town was besieged again between 2 September and 12 October. Newcastle bombarded Hull from siege forts armed with eighteen cannon. Although the town suffered much damage from the bombardment, it was once again replenished by sea, and in early October Parliamentarian sallies damaged or captured some of the siege forts. Along with a Royalist defeat at the Battle of Winceby, this led Newcastle to lift the siege and retreat to York.

== See also ==
- Fortifications of Kingston upon Hull
