= Surveyor-General of the Ordnance =

Office of the Surveyor-General of the Ordnance
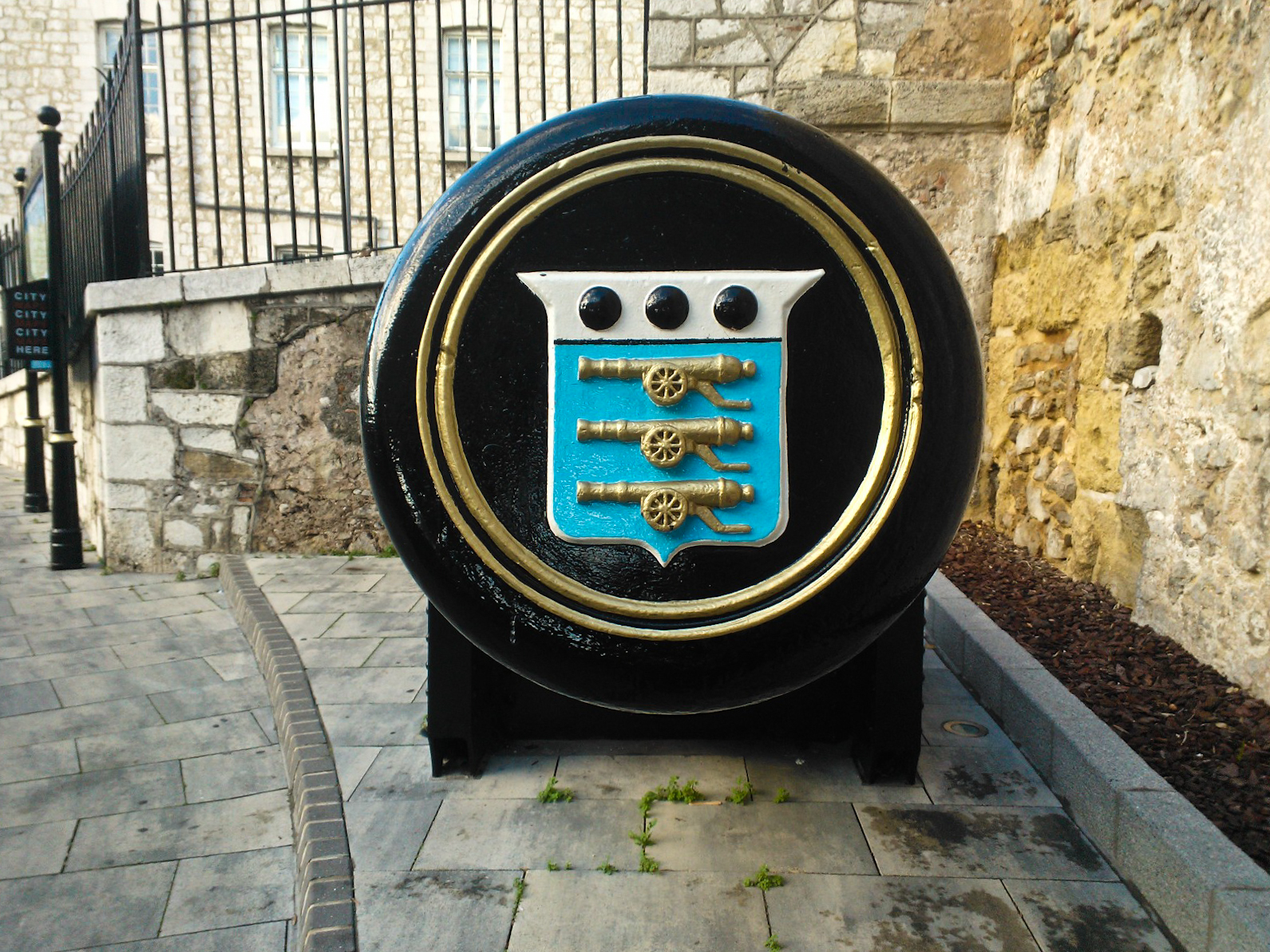
- Board of Ordnance Arms preserved on a gun tampion in Gibraltar
- v
- Member of: Board of Ordnance (1538-1888)
- Reports to: Master-General of the Ordnance
- Appointer: Prime Minister; Subject to formal approval by the Queen-in-Council
- Term length: Not fixed (typically 3–9 years)
- Inaugural holder: Henry Johnson
- Formation: 1538-1888

The Surveyor-General of the Ordnance was a subordinate of the Master-General of the Ordnance and a member of the Board of Ordnance, a British government body, from its constitution in 1597. Appointments to the post were made by the crown under Letters Patent. His duties were to examine the ordnance received to see that it was of good quality. He also came to be responsible for the mapping of fortifications and eventually the whole of all Great Britain, through the Ordnance Survey, and it is this role that is generally associated with surveyor-generalship.

== History ==
The post was for a time held with that of Chief Engineer, but after 1750 became a political office, with the holder changing with the government of the day.

The office was vacant at the time the Board of Ordnance was abolished in 1855, the last holder, Lauderdale Maule, having died of cholera on assignment with forces in Crimea, on August 1, 1854.

The War Office Act 1870 revived the office, making the Surveyor-General the senior civilian adviser to the Secretary of State for War, responsible for all aspects of Army logistics. The position was expected to advise on highly complex matters of supply, transport, equipment and ordnance, and was meant to be a former senior military officer who could answer questions to Parliament and exercise strict control over expenditures on supplies and stores. The Surveyor-General was meant to oversee the Director of Artillery and Stores, the Director of Supplies and Transport, the Director of Clothing, the Director of Contracts and the Inspector-General of Fortifications, as well as the controllers in each military district responsible to their respective major-generals.

The office was filled until 1888, when it was abolished.

== Surveyors-General of the Ordnance ==
- 5 February 1538: Henry Johnson
- 23 January 1549: Anthony Anthony
- 25 June 1565: Henry Iden
- 2 December 1568: Thomas Pynner
- 10 April 1570: vacant
- 13 April 1570: William Jurden
- 21 June 1595: William Partridge
- 21 June 1598: vacant
- 3 February 1599: John Davies (knighted 12 July 1599)
- 17 July 1602: John Linewray (knighted 10 July 1604)
- 11 June 1606: Joseph Earth
- 5 September 1609: Sir John Kaye
- 1 May 1624: Richard Kaye
- 28 November 1624: vacant
- 27 September 1625: Sir Alexander Brett
- 29 October 1627: vacant
- 3 December 1627: Sir Thomas Bludder
- 8 April 1628: Sir Paul Harris (succeeded as 2nd Baronet January 1629)
- Interregnum; post occupied by:
  - George Payler, March 1643 to December 1658
  - Elia Palmer, in 1660
- 22 June 1660: Francis Nicholls
- 28 July 1669 (or before): vacant
- 13 November 1669: Jonas Moore I (knighted 28 January 1673)
- 25 August 1679: Jonas Moore II (knighted 9 August 1680)
- 13 July 1682: vacant
- 29 July 1682: Sir Bernard de Gomme
- 23 November 1685: vacant
- 2 December 1685: Sir Henry Sheeres
- 19 July 1689: John Charlton
- 29 June 1702: William Bridges
- 30 October 1714: vacant
- 2 December 1714: Michael Richards
- 5 February 1722: vacant
- 10 February 1722: John Armstrong
- 25 April 1742: vacant
- 30 April 1742: Thomas Lascelles
- 10 April 1750: Charles Frederick
- February 1770: Thomas Desaguliers
- 13 May 1782: Thomas Pelham
- 20 May 1783: John Courtenay
- 22 May 1784: James Luttrell
- 23 December 1788: vacant
- 20 April 1789: George Cranfield Berkeley
- 10 July 1795: Alexander Ross
- 22 November 1804: James Murray Hadden
- 20 July 1810: Robert Moorsom (knighted 2 January 1815)
- 16 March 1820: Sir Ulysses Bagenal Burgh (succeeded as 2nd Baron Downes 3 March 1826)
- 18 May 1827: Sir Edward Owen
- 1 April 1828: Sir Herbert Taylor
- 16 April 1829: Sir Henry Fane
- 15 January 1831: William Leader Maberly
- 4 December 1832: Charles Richard Fox
- 30 December 1834: Lord Edward Somerset
- 25 April 1835: Sir Rufane Shaw Donkin
- 1 May 1841: vacant
- 11 May 1841: Charles Richard Fox
- 13 September 1841: Jonathan Peel
- 14 July 1846: Charles Richard Fox
- 3 July 1852: Sir George Berkeley
- 18 January 1853: Lauderdale Maule
- 1 August 1854: vacant; duties performed by the Lieutenant-General of the Ordnance, Sir Hew Dalrymple Ross
- 6 June 1855: abolished
- 5 August 1870: Sir Henry Storks
- 26 February 1874: Lord Eustace Cecil
- 1 June 1880: Sir John Miller Adye
- 17 January 1882: Henry Robert Brand
- 27 June 1885: Guy Dawnay
- 6 February 1886: William Woodall
- 4 August 1886: Sir Henry Northcote

The office was abolished in 1888.
