= Henry Sheeres =

Sir Henry Sheeres (d. 21 April 1710) was an English military engineer and writer.

He was born the son of Henry Sheeres of Deptford, a captain in the Royal Navy. In 1666 he accompanied the Earl of Sandwich, the English ambassador, to Spain in a diplomatic capacity. On his return in 1668 he became intimate with Samuel Pepys, who took a strong liking for him, but his attachment cooled owing to the advances which Sheeres, who was something of a poet, made to Pepys's wife. Sheeres left England for Tangier in May 1669, and resided in that colony as engineer for fourteen years. He superintended the blowing up of the Mole in 1683, when the place was abandoned. He hastened to England in 1684 in order to defend, at court, Lord Dartmouth, the admiral at Tangier, against accusations of peculation. Aided by Pepys, he was successful in this task, and thereby permanently established himself in Dartmouth's favour.

In 1685 he took part in the campaign against the Duke of Monmouth as an officer of artillery, and was present at the Battle of Sedgemoor. In July he was knighted for his services, and about the same time was made Surveyor of the Ordnance. Sheeres preserved his loyalty to James II during the 1688 Glorious Revolution, but illness prevented him taking an active share in the contest. He followed the example of his patron, Dartmouth, in peacefully submitting to the new rulers when their authority was established. But he retained his devotion to James, and was twice arrested on suspicion of conspiring on his behalf, in June 1690 and in March 1695–1696. On 30 March 1700 he was chosen by the House of Commons as one of the trustees to regulate William III's Irish grants, which Parliament had resumed, and in March following was summoned from Ireland by the peers to explain the proceedings of the commission to their lordships. He died on 21 April 1710.

Sheeres, who was a member of the Royal Society, was the author of A Translation of Polybius (1693), An Essay on the Certainty and Causes of the Earth's Motion (1698) and A Discourse on the Mediterranean Sea and the Streights of Gibraltar (1703). He also edited two pamphlets by Sir Walter Raleigh, A Discourse on Seaports (1700) and An Essay on Ways and Means to maintain the Honour of England (1701) He was part author of a translation of Lucian, published in 1711. A poem of his was prefixed to Thomas Southerne's Oronooko (1696).

== Works ==
- A Translation of Polybius (1693).
- An Essay on the Certainty and Causes of the Earth's Motion (1698).
- A Discourse on the Mediterranean Sea and the Streights of Gibraltar (1703).
