= Siege of Hull (1643) =

1643 battle of the First English Civil War

- Part of First English Civil War
Date	2 September – 12 October 1643
Location	Hull, East Riding of Yorkshire 53.744°N 0.332°W
Result	Parliamentarian victory

Belligerents
Royalists	Parliamentarians

Commanders and leaders
Earl of Newcastle	Lord Fairfax; Sir Thomas Fairfax; Sir John Meldrum; Oliver Cromwell; Robert Overton

Casualties and losses
Unknown	Unknown

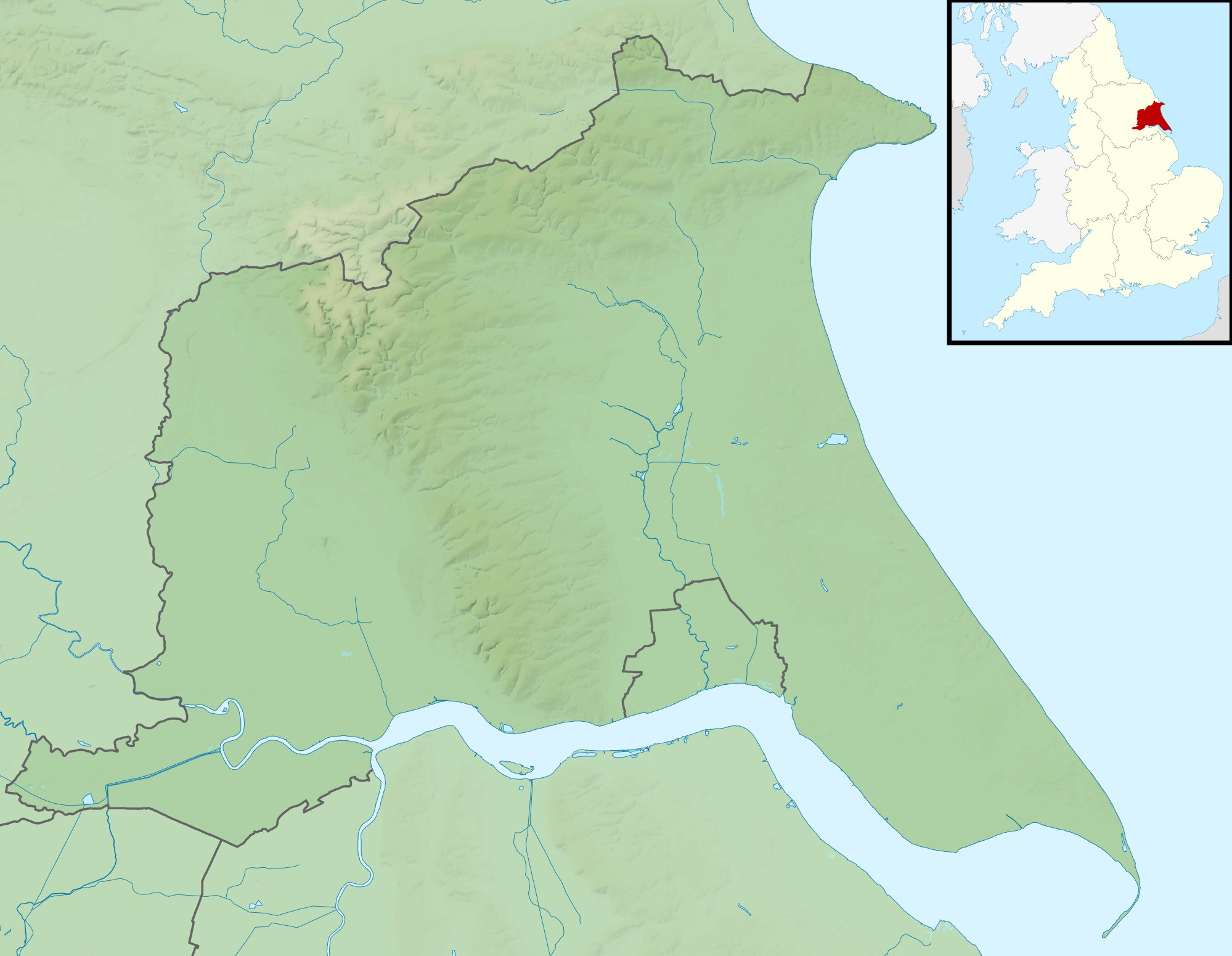
East Riding of Yorkshire and Hull

The unsuccessful second siege of Hull by the Royalist Earl of Newcastle in 1643 was a victory for Parliament at the high point of the Royalist campaign in the First English Civil War. It led to the abandonment of the Earl of Newcastle's campaign in Lincolnshire and the re-establishment of Parliament's presence in Yorkshire.

== Prelude ==
=== Lincolnshire campaign ===
After the victory over the army of Parliament under Lord Fairfax and Sir Thomas Fairfax at the Battle of Adwalton Moor on 30 June 1643, the Earl of Newcastle advanced with the main northern Royalist army into Lincolnshire. At this point in the civil war, Royalist fortunes were high, and Newcastle's advance joined Lord Hopton's and King Charles's armies in a three-pronged advance on London.

=== Gainsborough and Lincoln ===
On 16 July 1643, Lord Willoughby captured Gainsborough for Parliament, only to be immediately besieged by the Royalists under Sir Charles Cavendish. Parliament sent a relieving force under Sir John Meldrum and Colonel Oliver Cromwell, which beat the Royalists at the Battle of Gainsborough on 28 July. However, the arrival of Newcastle's main army forced the abandonment of Gainsborough, which, with Lincoln, fell quickly to the Royalists.

=== Fairfaxes ===
The Fairfaxes, meanwhile, having escaped from Adwalton Moor, made their ways separately to Hull, then the only remaining Parliamentary stronghold in Yorkshire. Sir John Hotham, the military governor of Hull, was arrested and removed by Major-General Robert Overton and the people of Hull in July 1643 after conspiring with Newcastle to surrender the city. Lord Fairfax was invited to take up the post by the townsfolk of Hull on 22 July. He fortified Hull, established a base at Beverley, and set about vigorous raids on Royalist garrisons in Yorkshire.

Newcastle now faced a choice. He had Boston and the Eastern Association apparently open in front of him, but faced the prospect of the still-intact army of Lord Fairfax behind him in Hull. Fairfax's attack on Stamford Bridge, near York, prompted Newcastle that he must deal with this threat to his rear, and he turned his army back north to face Fairfax, leaving garrisons in the captured Lincolnshire towns and strongholds.

=== Beverley ===
Newcastle advanced with 12,000 foot and 4,000 horse, together with his siege train including the guns "Gog" and "Magog". Fairfax's force of 1,800 foot and 20 troops of horse, decided to retreat to the fortifications of Hull. Beverley was abandoned on 28 August, and occupied by the Royalist army, where

...the men (Royalist soldiers) that stayed in the town fell to their old trade of plundering, spoiling and stripping all ages and sexes ... they plundered the whole town consisting of above a thousand families and sent their booty of cattel and goods to Yorke. .... Thus they have done also to all the towns adjoyning.

Within the week, Fairfax's army was back in Hull.

== Siege ==
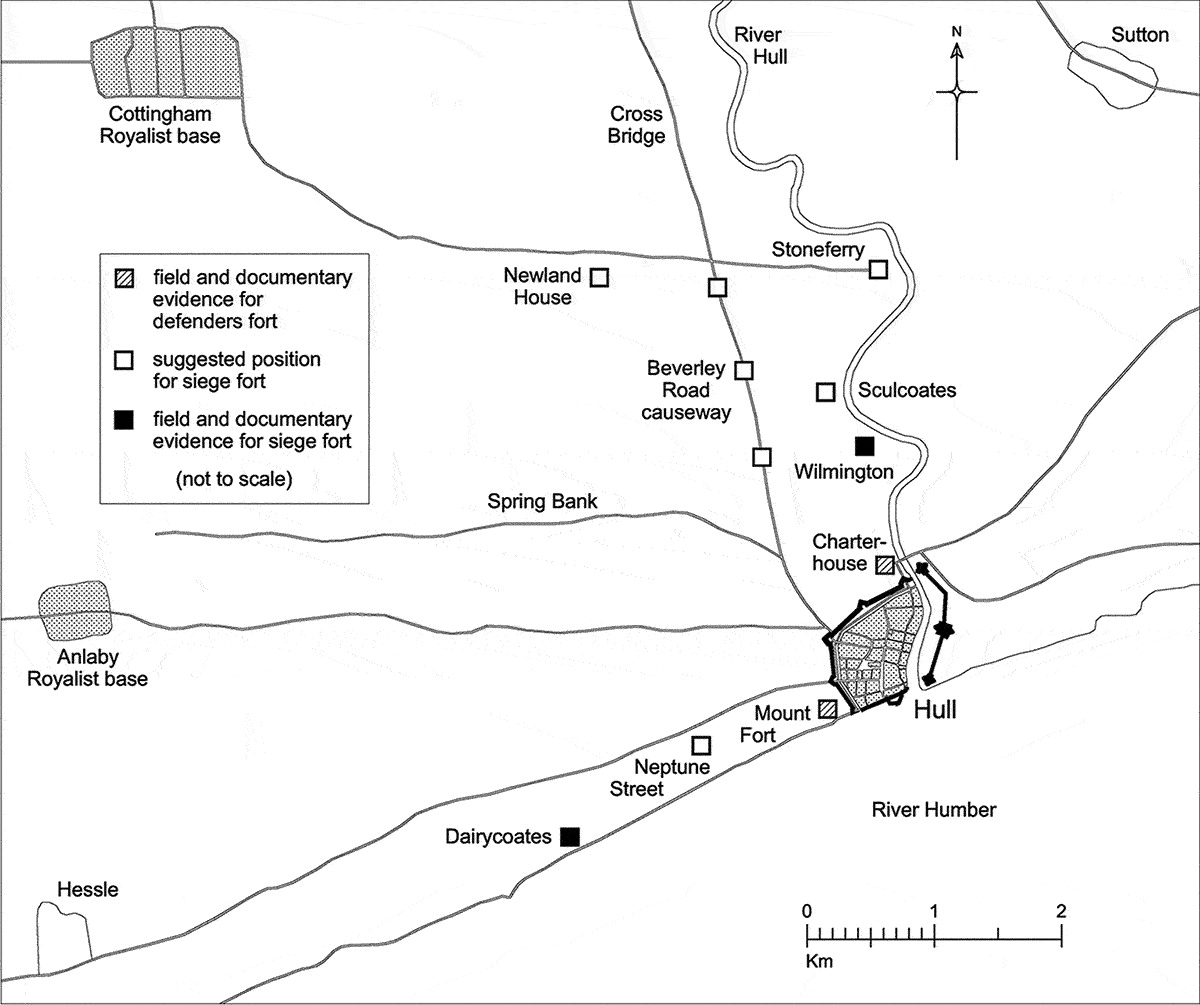
The position of siege forts around Hull in 1643

Newcastle's army followed closely, occupying the villages around Hull, and began to construct siegeworks for the investment of the city. The Royalist siege artillery began the bombardment on 2 September, but without great effect because the works were too far away from the city walls, the shot being almost spent by the time it reached the city. The Royalists attempted to push their earthworks nearer to make their guns more effective. However, one such work, Fort Royal, was taken by the defenders and destroyed within a week of construction.

On 14 September, Fairfax ordered the sluices be opened and the banks of the Humber be broken, as had happened in the first siege of Hull in 1642. This flooded the surrounding land to a distance of two miles.

The Parliamentary warships Lion (captained by Thomas Rainsborough) and Employment arrived to control the Humber Estuary and bring in supplies.

On 22 September, Oliver Cromwell crossed the Humber from Lincolnshire with arms and ammunition for the defenders, and joined the Fairfaxes in the defence of the city. Four days later, on 26 September, Sir Thomas Fairfax ferried his dragoons and cavalry back across the Humber to join the Eastern Association forces in Lincolnshire. Sir John Meldrum brought 500 further reinforcements to the defenders.

On 9 October, the Royalists attempted to storm the defences. Although some outlying works were captured, the assault failed to seize the city. The defenders launched a counterattack two days later on 11 October, with 1,500 men comprising soldiers from the garrison, sailors from the warships and townspeople. Led by Meldrum, the force was divided into two columns under Colonel John Lambert and Colonel Thomas Rainsborough of the Lion. This attack pushed back the Royalists and captured several emplacements and heavy guns.

== Aftermath ==
On 12 October, Newcastle admitted defeat and lifted the siege. He withdrew to York. The lifting of the siege was marked by an annual public holiday in Hull until the Restoration.

On 11 October, the Royalists had been defeated at the Battle of Winceby in Lincolnshire. These two defeats ended Royalist hopes of advancing on London and threw them on the defensive. The Parliamentarians began their advance into Yorkshire that was to culminate with Newcastle being besieged in York and the consequent Battle of Marston Moor.

== See also ==
- Fortifications of Kingston upon Hull
