= Cottingham =

Cottingham may refer to:

== Places ==
- Cottingham, East Riding of Yorkshire, England
  - Cottingham railway station, a railroad station in Cottingham
  - Cottingham High School, a secondary school in Cottingham
- Cottingham, Northamptonshire, England

== Buildings ==
- Cottingham Castle (disambiguation), two castles in Cottingham, East Riding of Yorkshire, England
- Cottingham House, a house built in 1907 in Louisiana, USA

== Other ==
- Cottingham Phoenix, an English rugby team
- Cottingham Springboard Festival, an annual grassroots music festival in Cottingham, East Riding of Yorkshire

== People with the surname ==
- Bob Cottingham (born 1966), American Olympic fencer
- Cicely Cottingham, American artist
- Edward B. Cottingham (1928–2021), American politician
- Henry Cottingham (17th century), Anglican priest
- John Cottingham (born 1943), British philosopher
- Kathryn L. Cottingham, American ecologist and environmentalist
- Laura Cottingham (born 1959), American art critic, curator and visual artist
- Lewis Nockalls Cottingham (1787–1847), British architect
- Richard Cottingham (born 1946), American serial killer
- Robert Cottingham (born 1935), American photorealist painter
- Thomas de Cottingham (c. 1300–1370), English cleric and judge
- Walter H. Cottingham (1866–1930), Canadian businessman
- William McOuat Cottingham (1905–1983), Canadian politician
