= Cottingham Castle =

Cottingham Castle may refer to:

- Cottingham castle, a large house and associated tower folly in Cottingham, East Riding of Yorkshire, England
- Baynard Castle, Cottingham, a former moated manor house in Cottingham, East Riding of Yorkshire, England
