= Old Manor House, Cottingham =

House in Cottingham, East Riding of Yorkshire, England

Coordinates: 53°47′00″N 0°25′19″W

The Old Manor House, also known as Sarum Manor, is a historic building in Cottingham, East Riding of Yorkshire, a village in England.

The manor house was probably built in the 16th century and lies off Hallgate, in a location not visible from the street. It lies on the site of Baynard Castle. Nikolaus Pevsner describes it as "one of the best preserved timber-framed farmhouses in the East Riding". The building was grade II listed in 1951. A porch was added in the 1960s.

The house is timber framed with brick infill, some additions in stone and a pantile roof. There are two storeys and four bays. On the front is a projecting porch, and the windows are horizontally sliding sashes.

== See also ==
- Listed buildings in Cottingham, East Riding of Yorkshire
