= Baynard Castle =

Baynard Castle may refer to:

- Baynard Castle, Cottingham, East Riding of Yorkshire
- Baynard's Castle, London
