= Castle Hill Tower =

Building in Cottingham, East Riding of Yorkshire, England

Coordinates: 53°46′36″N 0°26′55″W

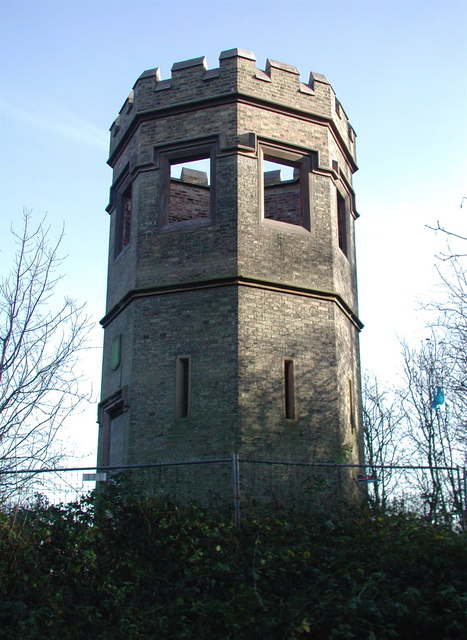
The building, in 2007

Castle Hill Tower, also known as Thompson's Folly, is a historic structure in Cottingham, East Riding of Yorkshire, a village in England.

Thomas Thompson built a large house, known as Cottingham Castle, in 1816. Atop a hill in its grounds, he had a folly constructed, in the form of a Gothick tower. It served as a belvedere, with views stretching to the Humber Estuary. The house burned down in 1861, and its grounds were later developed as Castle Hill Hospital. The folly stands to its full height of 25 feet (7.6 m), but has lost its roof and floors, and its entrance has been bricked up. It was grade II listed in 1984.

The tower is built of white brick on the exterior and red brick on the interior, with stone dressings, and is on a plinth. It has a moulded floor band, an eaves band, and an embattled parapet. There is an octagonal plan and two storeys. At ground floor level is a blocked square-headed doorway with a hood mould under a shield, and slit windows, while at upper floor level there are oblong windows under a continuous hood mould.

== See also ==
- Listed buildings in Cottingham, East Riding of Yorkshire
