= Ashby, Norfolk =

Ashby, Norfolk may be a reference to a couple of places in the English county of Norfolk:

- the hamlet of Ashby, part of the parish of Ashby with Oby
- the village of Ashby St Mary
