= St Mary's Church, Cottingham =

Church in Cottingham, East Riding of Yorkshire, England

Coordinates: 53°46′56″N 0°24′42″W

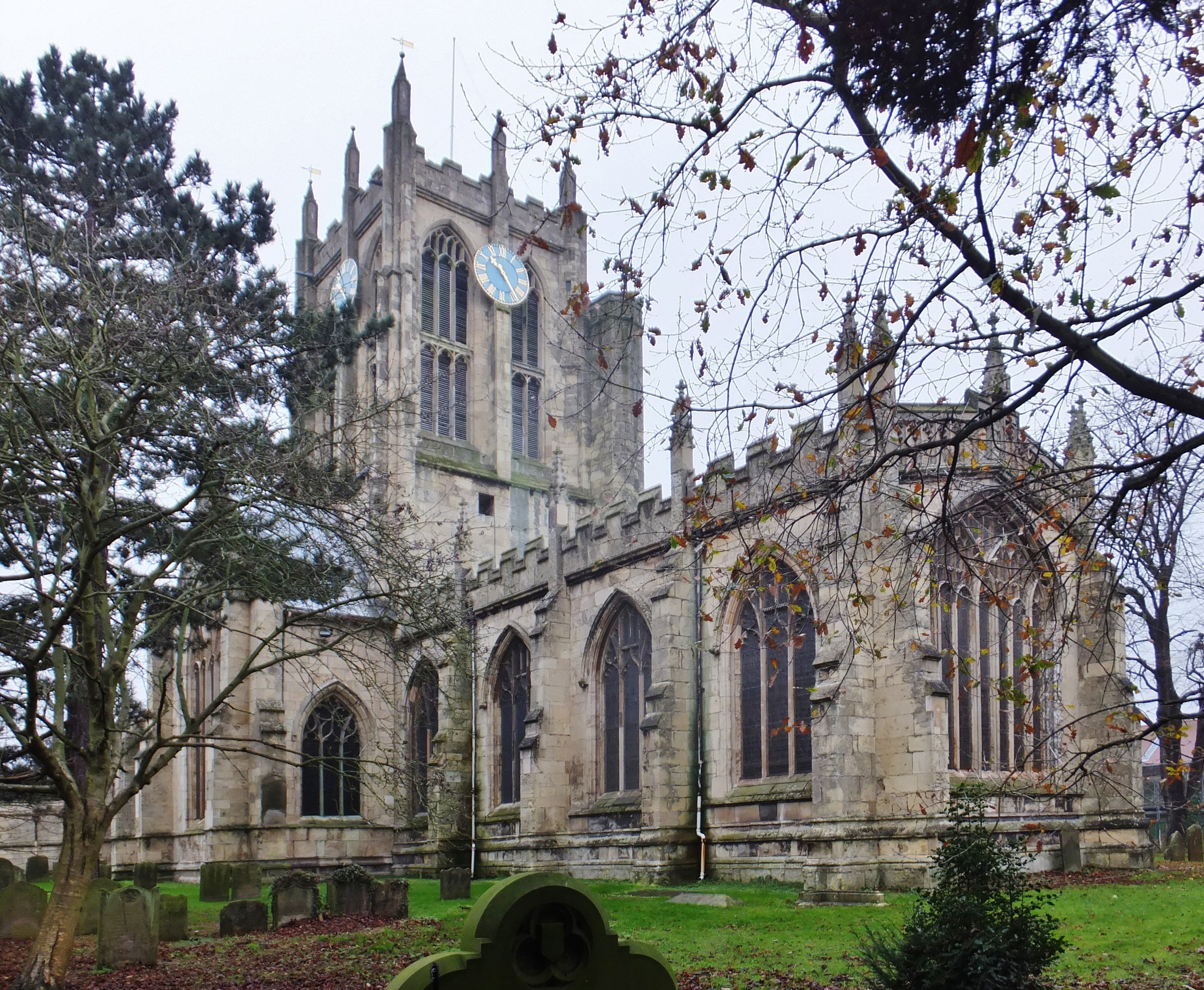
The church, in 2023

St Mary's Church is the parish church of Cottingham, East Riding of Yorkshire, a village in England.

The church was built in the 14th century, the nave and aisles completed early in the century, and the chancel was completed in 1374 and the porch at a similar time. The tower was constructed in the 15th century, and in 1744 it was strengthened and pinnacles were added. The church was restored between 1844 and 1845, the work including removing internal galleries and a room above the porch, and raising the floor level. The chancel was restored and its roof replaced between 1895 and 1896, to a design by Smith, Brodrick and Lowther. The building was grade I listed in 1967.

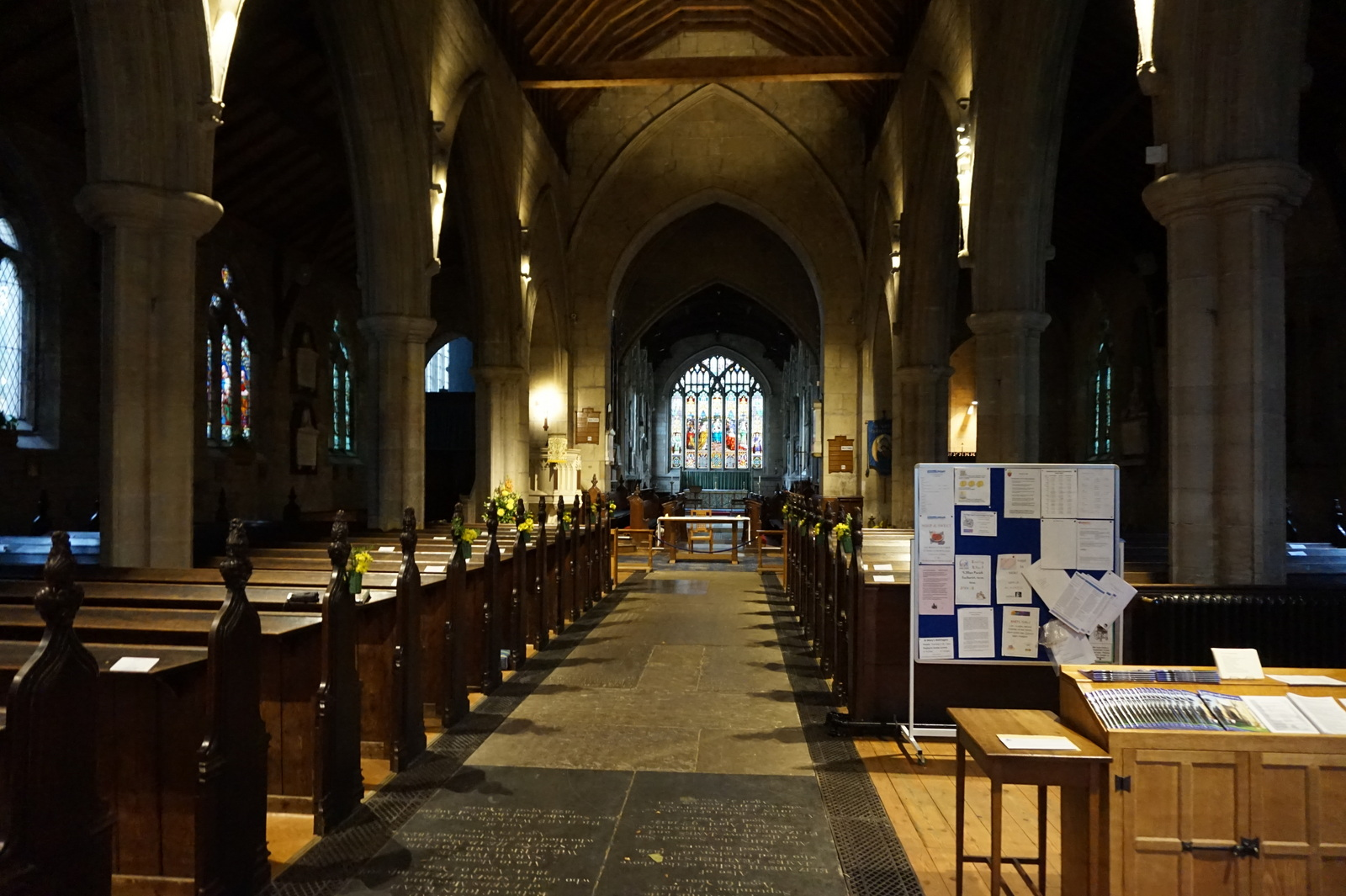
View east inside the church

The church is built of stone with lead roofs, and has a cruciform plan, consisting of a nave, north and south aisles, a south porch, north and south transepts, a chancel with a north vestry, and a tower at the crossing. The tower has two stages, buttresses, a polygonal northeast stair turret, paired pointed bell openings, clock faces, an embattled parapet, and corner and intermediate pinnacles with blank traceried panels and pyramid and ball caps. The body of the church also has embattled parapets, and crocketed pinnacles. Inside, there is a brass memorial to Nicholas de Luda, who died in 1384 and later memorials including several from the 18th century. There are numerous stained glass windows, several designed by Jean-Baptiste Capronnier which display a wide range of colour.

== See also ==
- Grade I listed buildings in the East Riding of Yorkshire
- Listed buildings in Cottingham, East Riding of Yorkshire
