= Hugh fitzBaldric =

11th-century Norman nobleman

Hugh fitzBaldric (sometimes Hugh FitzBaldric or Hugh fitz Baldric) was a Norman nobleman and royal official in England after the Norman Conquest of England.

Hugh first appears in the historical record around 1067 when he was the witness to a charter of Gerold de Roumara.

Hugh held the office of Sheriff of Yorkshire from 1069 to around 1080, succeeding William Malet in that office.

Hugh had lands in Yorkshire and Lincolnshire, and was listed in Domesday Book as a tenant-in-chief. Hugh's tenure of the estate at Cottingham in Yorkshire is considered to mean that he was a feudal baron. Katharine Keats-Rohan states that Hugh lost his lands after the conclusion of Domesday Book in 1086, likely for supporting Robert Curthose as king against William Rufus after the death of William the Conqueror. But I. J. Sanders states that Hugh's lands were divided after his death and does not mention any forfeiture of the lands.

It is possible that the Hugh fitz Baldric who witnessed a charter of Robert Curthose's in 1089 is the same person as the former sheriff.

The Domesday Book records that Walter de Rivere and Guy of Croan were sons-in-law of Hugh.

Hugh gave some of his English lands to Préaux Abbey in Normandy and St Mary's Abbey in York.

Hugh was memorialized in the liber vitae of Thorney Abbey.
