= Southwood Hall =

House in Cottingham, East Riding of Yorkshire, England

Coordinates: 53°46′34″N 0°25′33″W

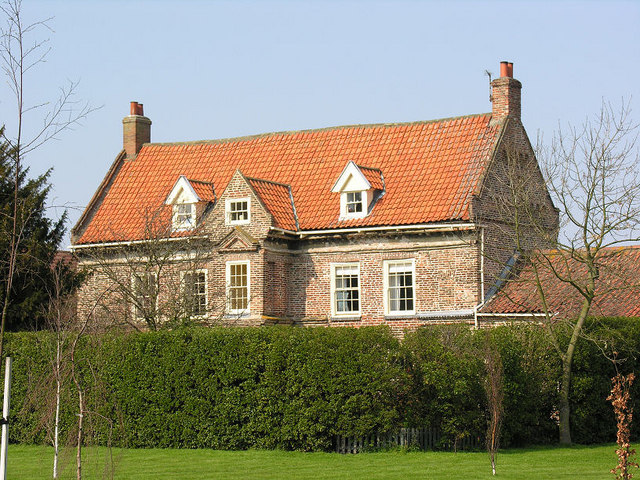
The building, in 2007

Southwood Hall is a historic building in Cottingham, East Riding of Yorkshire, a village in England.

The house lies on the south side of Southwood Road in Cottingham. It was built before 1661, for the Bacchus family. The fireplaces in the main rooms were replaced around 1720, but the interior is otherwise unaltered. The eaves were raised at the same time, while the front door was replaced in the 20th century. Historic England describes it as "probably the best-preserved example of its type and period" in the East Riding. It was grade II* listed in 1951.

The house is built of red brick on a plinth, with a moulded floor band, a moulded band below a dentilled eaves cornice, and a pantile roof with raised gables on brick kneelers. It has two storeys and is five bays wide. In the centre is a three-storey gabled porch, with pilasters on the front and sides, containing a round-headed doorway original ironwork. The windows are sashes under flat brick gauged arches, the window above the doorway with a moulded cornice and a pediment. On the roof are two gabled dormers with horizontally sliding sashes. Original features inside include the staircase, a fireplace in the attic and most of the floorboards, while the internal doors and surrounds are variously original and early 18th century.

== See also ==
- Grade II* listed buildings in the East Riding of Yorkshire
- Listed buildings in Cottingham, East Riding of Yorkshire
