= The Lawns =

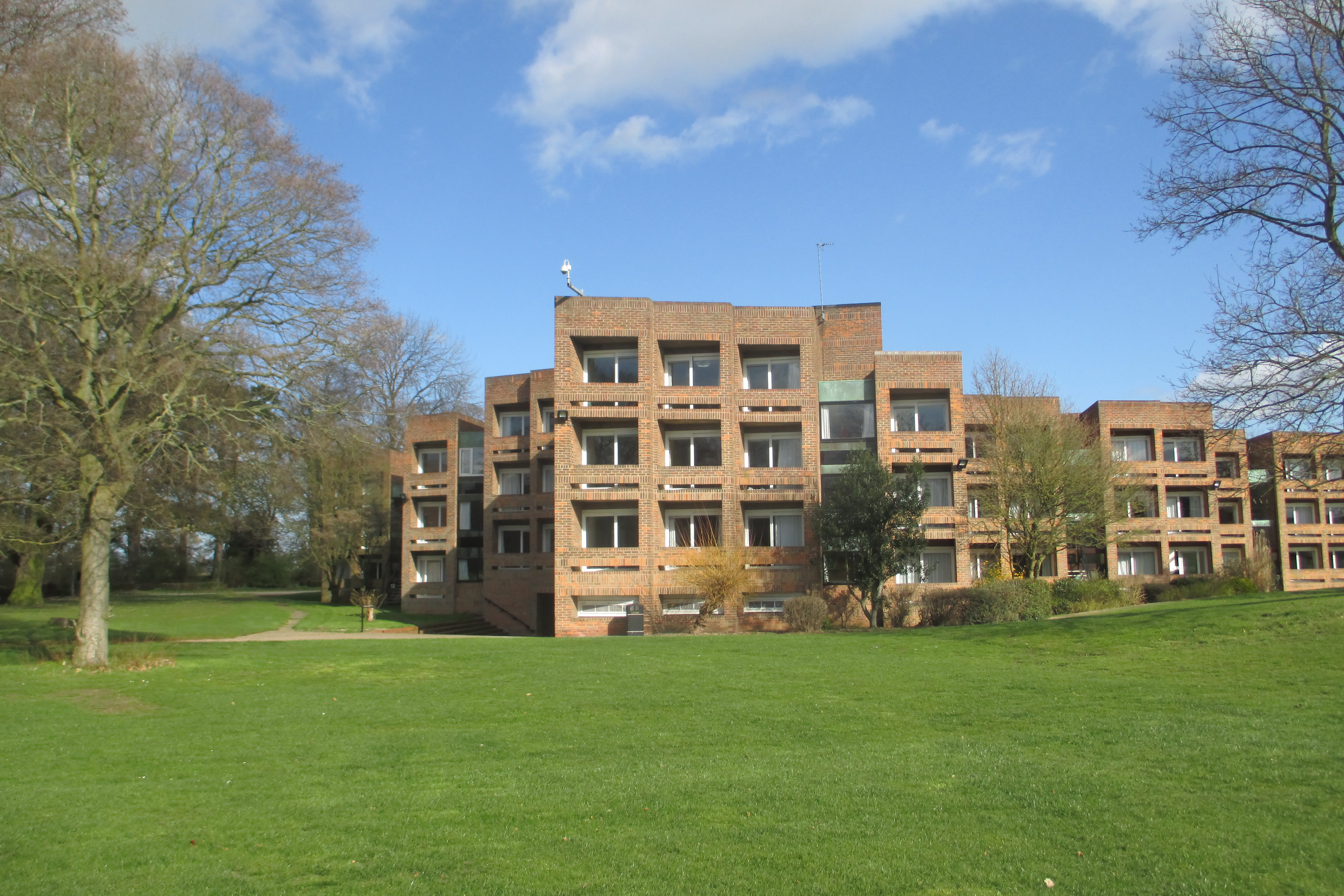

General information
- Type: Halls of Residence
- Location: Harland Way, Cottingham, East Riding of Yorkshire
- Coordinates: 53.7862°N 0.4235°W (grid reference TA0333)
- Construction started: 1962
- Completed: 1968
- Closed: 2019
- Owner: University of Hull

Technical details
- Grounds: 40 acres (16 ha)

Listed Building – Grade II*
- Official name: Reckitt Hall; Morgan Hall; Grant Hall; Downs Hall; Lambert Hall; Nicholson Hall
- Designated: 30 March 1993
- Reference no.: 1103343; 1103344; 1103345; 1103346; 1232675; 1276987

The Lawns is a former student accommodation complex for the University of Hull, located in Cottingham, East Riding of Yorkshire, England. It comprised seven halls of residence (Ferens, Lambert, Nicholson, Morgan, Downs, Reckitt and Grant) and the Lawns Centre. The latter was the complex's catering and social hub. The halls accommodated almost 1,000 students. With the exception of the older Ferens Hall, The Lawns was built in the 1960s to the designs of architectural firm Gillespie, Kidd and Coia. The halls are Grade II* listed buildings, though the site was closed as student accommodation at the end of the 2018/2019 academic year.

== Description ==
The Lawns are set in 40 acres (16 ha) of landscaped parkland, the grounds of the former Cottingham Grange. This had been used as an army camp in the Second World War; the nearby Ferens Hall was originally known as 'Camp Hall'. Ferens is of a traditional rectangular 'Sandhurst block style' with the accommodation around three sides of a central lawn. It is somewhat isolated from the other halls both by its location and by a natural screen of trees.

In 1961, Isi Metzstein and Andrew MacMillan of Glasgow-based firm Gillespie, Kidd and Coia were appointed to design accommodation for a further 1,000 students at The Lawns. They designed a series of twelve halls, each comprising five blocks identified by the letters A to E, and accommodating approximately 140 residents. A typical block configuration was three floors, with each floor accommodating nine students in seven rooms. The scheme was constructed between 1962 and 1968, when six of the projected twelve blocks were complete. In that year, The Lawns was awarded a RIBA Bronze Regional Award. In 1993, the six contemporary halls were designated as Grade II* listed buildings and are recorded in the National Heritage List for England, maintained by Historic England.

The Lawns was connected by bus services to the university and to the city centre at Hull Paragon Interchange.

=== Management ===
From the date of inception until 1969, Halls of Residence at the University of Hull were presided over by the "Halls of Residence Committee". This committee was responsible for the day-to-day running of Traditional halls until the creation of The Lawns. The committee was composed of wardens, facilities management from the university and the vice-chancellor. In 1968 at the decision of the committee the "Halls of Residence Committee" was dissolved and the council of the newly built Lawns complex (known as "The Lawns Forum") gained the responsibility of term-time activity at The Lawns. Financial matters and conference responsibilities all passed to the relevant departments of the university and out of the hands of the wardens.

=== Closure ===
By the start of the 2017/2018 academic year, The Lawns was the last operating halls of residence site in Cottingham following the closures of Cleminson Hall in 2004, Needler Hall in 2016, and Thwaite Hall in the summer of 2017. Ferens, Downs, and Reckitt halls were closed at the end of the 2017–2018 academic year. Pursuing a strategy of concentrating accommodation on its main campus, the university closed The Lawns and Ferens Hall in 2019, and placed the complex on the market in 2021. After closure, the empty 40-acre site was used for police firearms training and is earmarked for housing development. In May 2021 the Twentieth Century Society placed the site on its Top 10 Buildings at Risk List. During 2023, the site was proposed to be used as housing for those seeking asylum however, after local backlash these plans were dropped.

== The Halls ==
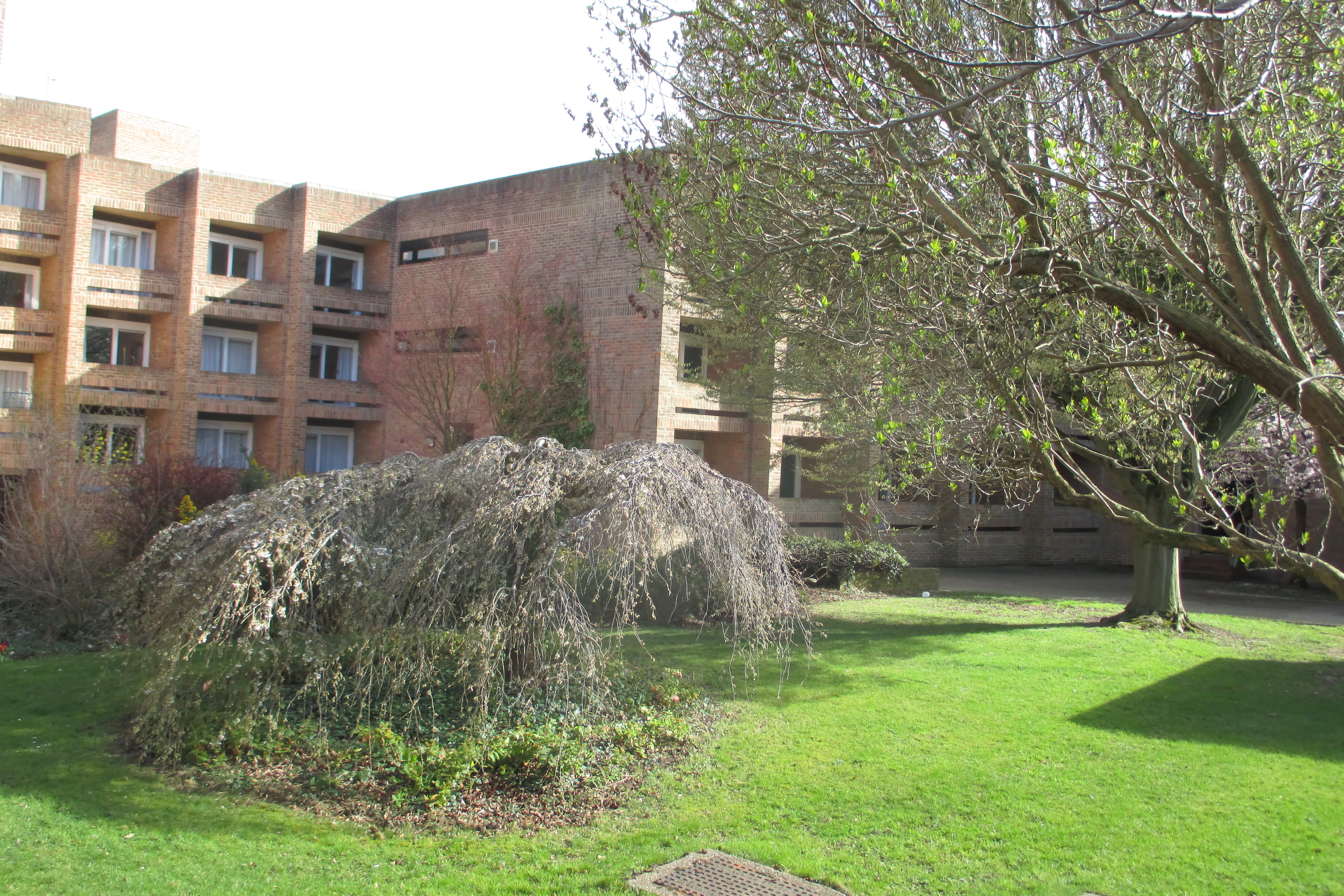
Gardens at Grant Hall

=== The Lawns Centre ===
The Lawns Centre had a £2.5 million refurbishment following flooding in Cottingham. Facilities included meeting rooms, lecture theatres, gym and leisure facilities, dining room and bar.

=== Downs Hall ===
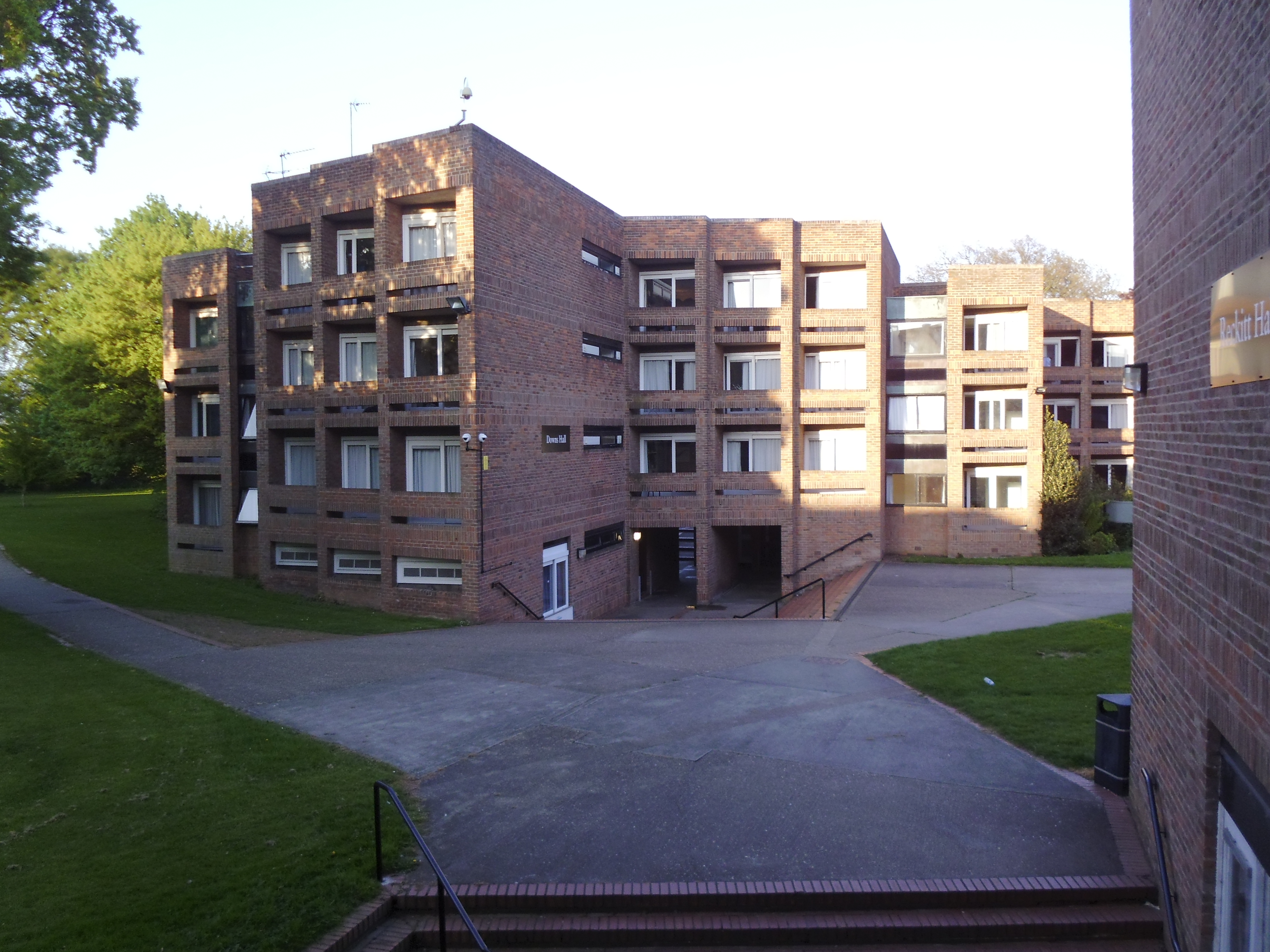
Downs Hall, taken from Reckitt opposite

Downs Hall offered accommodation to 132 students in single rooms. Most rooms have a sun terrace. Before 1985, Downs Hall offered accommodation to male students only. However, due to a decline in preference for an all-male hall, at the start of the 1984/1985 academic year, Downs Hall was open to both male and female students. The hall closed at the end of the 2017–2018 academic year.

=== Morgan Hall ===
Morgan Hall was the third hall of the planned 12 halls of residence upon the Lawns Complex. Morgan Hall takes its name from the first principal of Hull University College, Arthur Morgan. The Hall has 133 single rooms, most with balconies.

=== Nicholson Hall ===
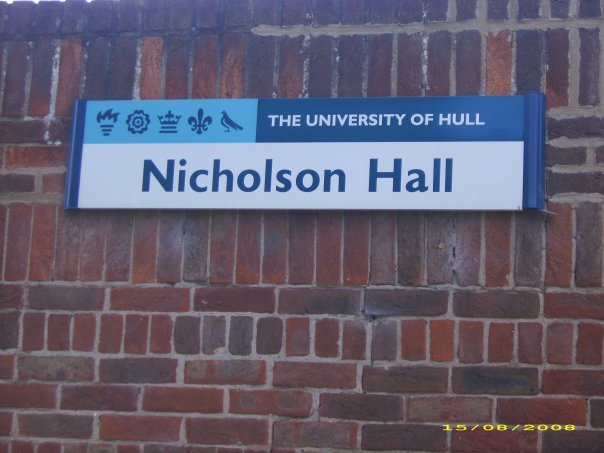
Nicholson Hall

Nicholson Hall was the fifth hall of the Lawns Complex. It takes its name from the principal of Hull University College in 1935, John Nicholson. Nicholson led the campaign to achieve the college's independence, which eventuated on 13 May 1954. Nicholson Hall housed approximately 142 students in both medium and en-suite rooms. In later years this was the only self-catered Hall on the Lawns Complex; previously this position had been held by Morgan Hall. Most rooms have washbasins and a balcony. In 2009 Nicholson Hall was re-furbished converting all double rooms to singles, updated kitchen diner kitchens similar to the Downs and Morgan Hall designs with additional en-suite facilities in particular blocks.

=== Lambert Hall ===
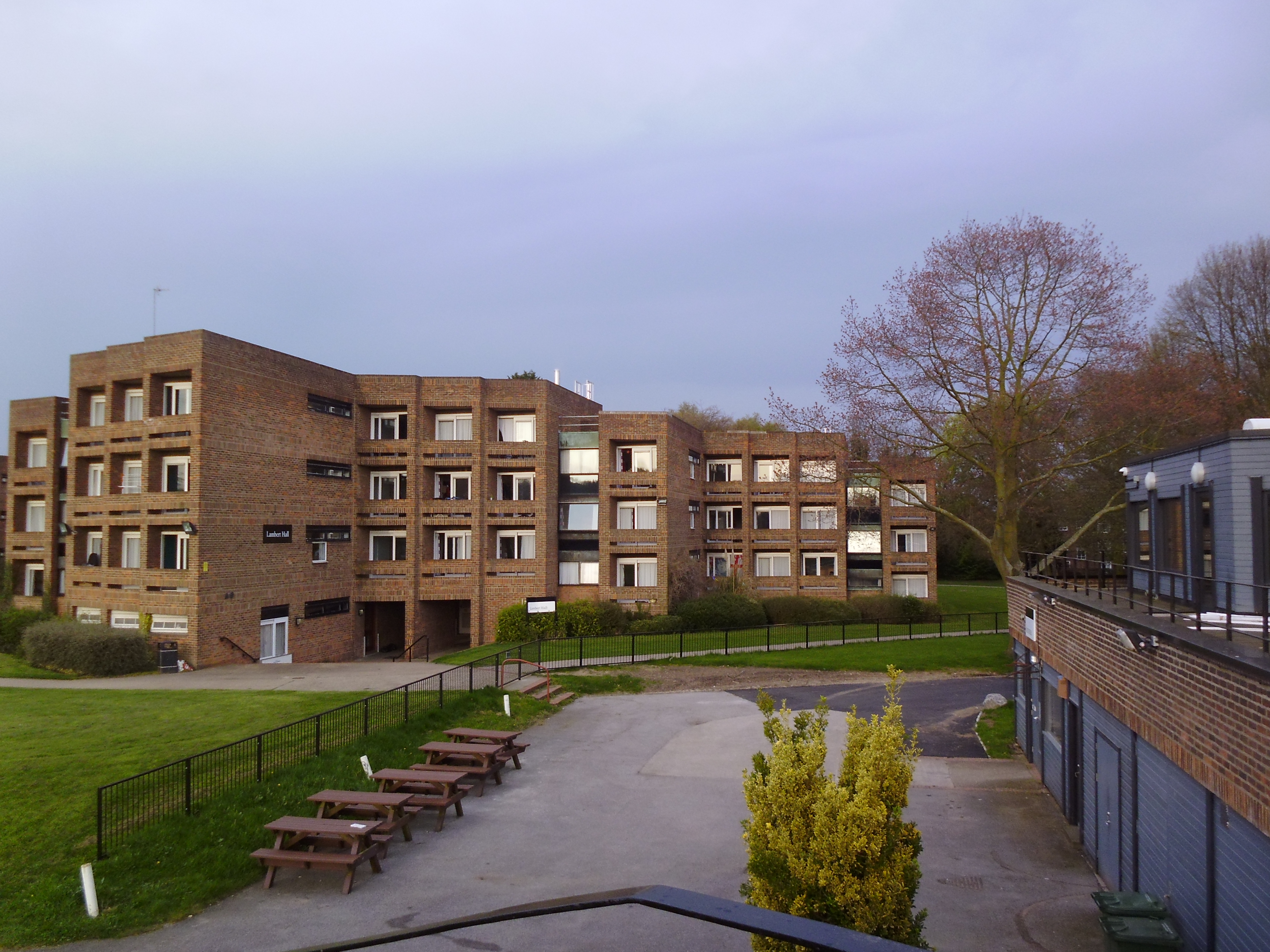
Lambert in 2018

Lambert Hall accommodated 130 students in a mixture of single and en-suite rooms. Most rooms have a balcony. Before 1985, Lambert Hall offered accommodation to female students only. At the start of the 1984/1985 academic year, Lambert Hall was open to both male and female students.

=== Reckitt Hall ===
Reckitt Hall accommodated 121 students in a mixture of single and en-suite rooms. Most rooms have a balcony. The hall closed at the end of the 2017–2018 academic year.

=== Grant Hall ===
Grant Hall was named after G. F. Grant, a co-founder of Hull University College in 1927. It accommodated 121 students across 2 blocks of single and 3 blocks of en-suite rooms.

=== Ferens Hall ===
Ferens Hall accommodated 191 students all in single rooms. It was established in the 1950s as a traditional (catered) male hall of residence. The hall closed at the end of the 2017–2018 academic year.

== See also ==
- Listed buildings in Cottingham, East Riding of Yorkshire
