= Carleton St Peter =

Hamlet in Norfolk, England

Coordinates: 52.567°N 1.450°E

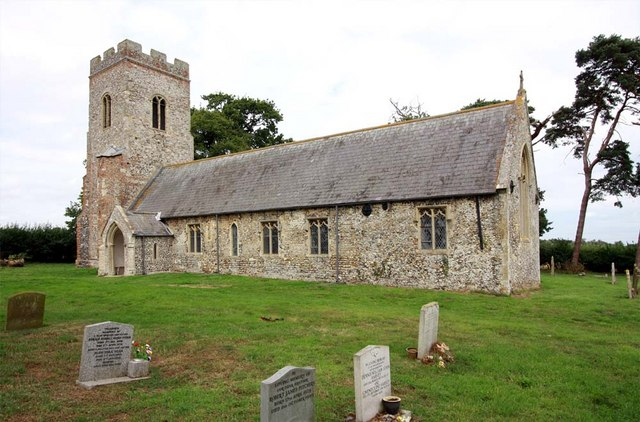
- St Peter, Carleton St Peter

- Location within Norfolk
- Area: 3.19 km^{2} (1.23 sq mi)
- Population: 29
  - Density: 9/km^{2} (23/sq mi)
- OS grid reference: TG338021
- Civil parish: Carleton St Peter
- District: South Norfolk
- Shire county: Norfolk
- Region: East
- Country: England
- Sovereign state: United Kingdom
- Post town: NORWICH
- Postcode district: NR14
- Police: Norfolk
- Fire: Norfolk
- Ambulance: East of England

Carleton St Peter is a civil parish in South Norfolk, about 8 1/2 miles (13.7 km) south-east of Norwich. There is no village centre but the church provides a reference point and is 1 mile (1.6 km) north-east of Thurton, and a similar distance south of Claxton, just east of Ashby St Mary. It extends north to the River Yare and to the south borders Langley School and comes close to the A146 road.

At the 2001 census Carleton St Peter contained 15 households and a population of 29 spread across the 3.19 km^{2} (1.23 sq mi) of the parish.

There is evidence of prehistoric settlement in the north of the parish, as well as Roman and Saxon settlement further south. In the Domesday Book the village is recorded as having 38 households with the land split between a number of tenants, the most significant of whom was Roger Bigot. A church was recorded, and the modern church, which is dedicated to St Peter and from which the village takes its name, dates from the Norman period.

The church cannot be reached by road and sits in a small graveyard in the middle of a field reached by a short path between ploughed fields. The tower, which was built in the early 16th century, contains four bells but they cannot be rung.

The parish extends northwards to include the Beauchamp Arms public house on the south bank of the River Yare and the nearby Buckenham Sailing Club. These lie at the end of Ferry Road. The vehicle ferry to Buckenham on the north bank stopped running before World War II.
