= Zion United Reformed Church, Cottingham =

Church in Cottingham, East Riding of Yorkshire, England

Coordinates: 53°46′54″N 0°25′02″W

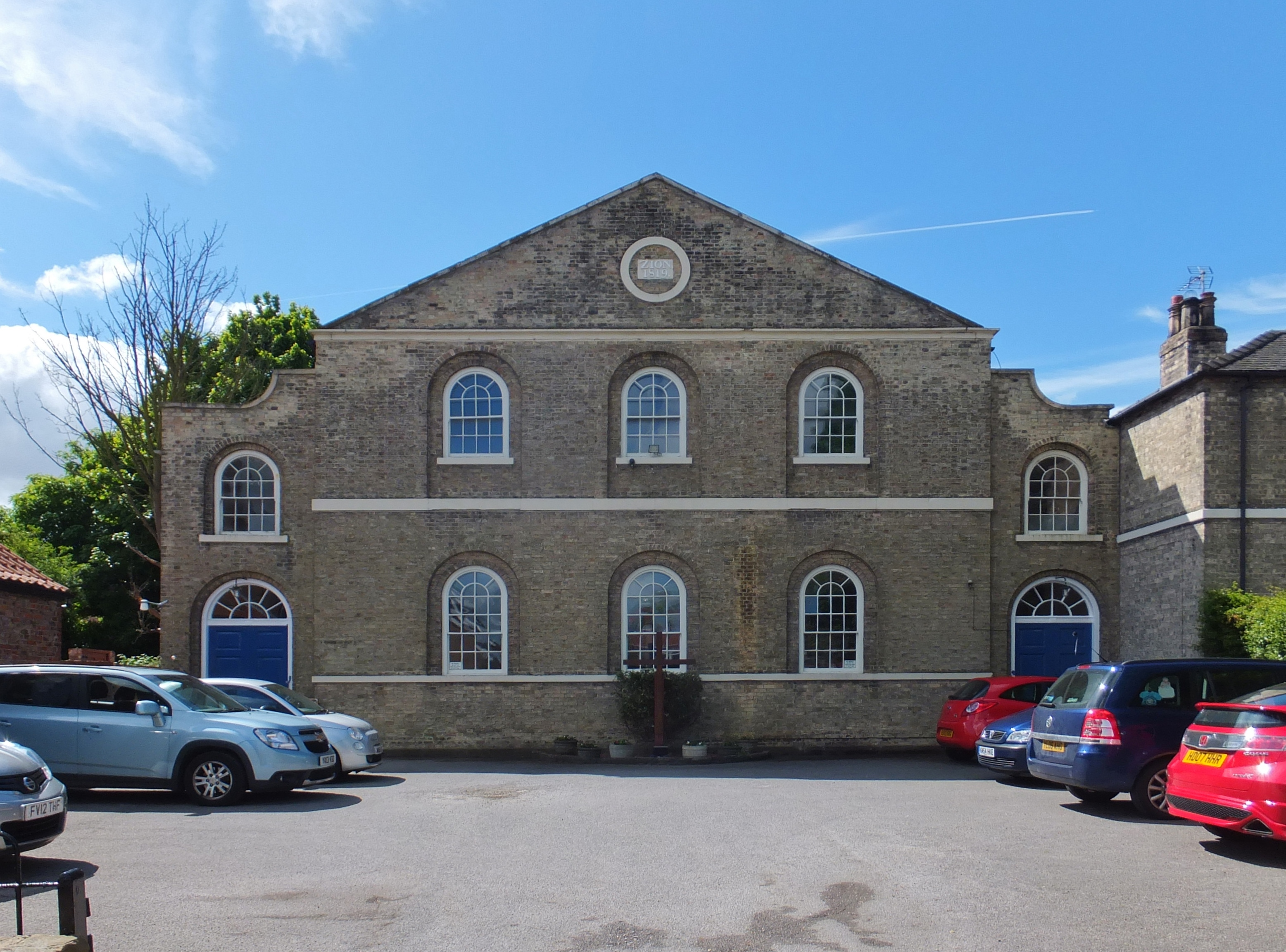
The church, in 2015

The Zion United Reformed Church is a historic church in Cottingham, East Riding of Yorkshire, a village in England.

The church was built in 1819 to a design by Appleton Bennison, for the Presbyterian Church of England. An organ was installed in 1896, but the building is otherwise unaltered. Historic England describes it as the "best preserved early 19th-century chapel" in the East Riding, while Nikolaus Pevsner describes it as "plain and honest and peaceful". The building was grade II* listed in 1967. In 1972, the Presbyterian Church became part of the United Reformed Church, which continues to worship in the building.

The church is built of white brick on a plinth, with stone dressings, a sill band, a floor band, a moulded cornice, a low pediment containing a dated and inscribed circular tablet, and a slate roof. It has two storeys and is three bays wide, withd flanking lower wings with ramped coped parapets. On each wing is a round-arched doorway and a fanlight with radial glazing. The windows are sashes with round-arched heads and radial glazing in round-arched recesses. Inside, it has a balcony on three sides, supported by cast iron columns. It has box pews, and there are staircases in the wings.

== See also ==
- Grade II* listed buildings in the East Riding of Yorkshire
- Listed buildings in Cottingham, East Riding of Yorkshire
