= Listed buildings in Cottingham, East Riding of Yorkshire =

Cottingham is a civil parish in the county of the East Riding of Yorkshire, England. It contains 36 listed buildings that are recorded in the National Heritage List for England. Of these, one is listed at Grade I, the highest of the three grades, eight are at Grade II*, the middle grade, and the others are at Grade II, the lowest grade. The parish contains the large village of Cottingham and the surrounding area. Most of the listed buildings are houses, cottages and associated structures, and the others include churches, a former workhouse, a folly, a railway station and associated structures, and a group of residential halls for the University of Hull.

== Key ==
Grade	Criteria
I	Buildings of exceptional interest, sometimes considered to be internationally important
II*	Particularly important buildings of more than special interest
II	Buildings of national importance and special interest

== Buildings ==
Name and location	Photograph	Date	Notes	Grade
St Mary's Church; 53.78227°N 0.41180°W		Early 14th century	The church has been altered and extended through the centuries. It is built in stone with lead roofs, and has a cruciform plan, consisting of a nave, north and south aisles, a south porch, north and south transepts, a chancel with a north vestry, and a tower at the crossing. The tower has two stages, buttresses, a polygonal northeast stair turret, paired pointed bell openings, clock faces, an embattled parapet, and corner and intermediate pinnacles with blank traceried panels and pyramid and ball caps. The body of the church also has embattled parapets, and crocketed pinnacles.	I
Old Manor House; 53.78322°N 0.42203°W	—	16th century (probable)	The house is timber framed with brick infill, some additions in stone and a pantile roof. There are two storeys and four bays. On the front is a projecting porch, and the windows are horizontally sliding sashes.	II
Southwood Hall; 53.77605°N 0.42594°W		c. 1660	The house is in red brick on a plinth, with a moulded floor band, a moulded band below a dentilled eaves cornice, and a pantile roof with raised gables on brick kneelers. There are two storeys and five bays. In the centre is a three-storey gabled porch, with pilasters on the front and sides, containing a round-headed doorway original ironwork. The windows are sashes under flat brick gauged arches, the window above the doorway with a moulded cornice and a pediment. On the roof are two gabled dormers with horizontally sliding sashes.	II*
7, 8 and 9 Market Green; 53.78153°N 0.41445°W		Late 17th to early 18th century	A row of three cottages in rendered and colourwashed brick, with a cogged brick eaves cornice, and a pantile roof with raised gables and brick copings. There is one storey and attics, and four bays. On the front are three doorways, horizontally sliding sash windows, and four swept roof dormers.	II
24 and 26 Beck Bank; 53.77986°N 0.40807°W		Early 18th century	A pair of cottages in pebbledashed and colourwashed brick, with a pantile roof, and tumbled-in brick to the raised gables. There is a single storey and attics, and two bays. On the front are two doorways, each with a sash window and panelled shutters to the right, and two swept roof dormers with horizontally sliding sash windows.	II
28 Beck Bank; 53.77995°N 0.40806°W		Early 18th century	The cottage is in red brick, with a dentilled brick eaves cornice, and a pantile roof with tumbled-in brick to the raised gables. There is a single storey and two bays. The central doorway is flanked by horizontally sliding sash windows with panelled shutters.	II
Sarum House; 53.78511°N 0.40907°W		Early to mid-18th century	The house is in red brick on a plinth, with a floor band, a stepped brick eaves cornice, and a pantile roof with tumbled-in brick on the raised gables. The doorway has pilasters, and the windows are sashes under segmental brick arches.	II
Church House; 53.78182°N 0.41186°W		1729	Originally a workhouse, the building was refronted in the 19th century. It is in colourwashed rendered brick, with rusticated quoins, oversailing eaves and a slate roof. There are two storeys and two bays. On the far left is a projecting gabled Gothic porch with a pointed doorway, the windows are sashes with Tudor hood moulds, and between the upper floor windows is an inscribed and dated plaque.	II
Coach house and stable, 270 Hallgate; 53.78249°N 0.42069°W	—	18th century	The building is in colourwashed brick, with a dentilled brick eaves cornice, ramped coped parapets, and a hipped pantile roof. The main block has two storeys and three bays, and flanking lower single-bay wings. On the main block are doorways and small louvred openings under segmental arches, and the upper floor has a taking-in door, and a window with pigeon holes below.	II
188 King Street; 53.78395°N 0.41381°W		Mid-18th century	The cottage is in red brick, with a cogged brick eaves cornice, and a pantile roof with a raised coped gable to the right. There is one storey and attics, and two bays. The doorway is in the centre, and it is flanked by casement windows.	II
100 and 102 Thwaite Street; 53.77851°N 0.40328°W		Mid-18th century	The house, later divided into two, is in red brick, and has a pantile roof with tumbled-in brick to the raised gables. There are two storeys and three bays, and a rear outshut. The two doorways are in the centre and have rectangular fanlights, and the windows are sashes.	II
Snuff Mill House and railings 53.77687°N 0.40841°W		c. 1760	The house is in red brick, with a band under a low coped parapet, and a double-span roof. There are three storeys and two bays, and a double depth plan. The doorway on the right bay has an eared architrave, a pulvinated frieze, and a low pediment. Above it is a Venetian stair window, and the other windows are sashes under flat gauged brick arches. To the south is a low coped wall with railings and two square piers with cornices, and there is a gateway with piers surmounted by pineapple finials.	II
The White House; 53.78235°N 0.42069°W	—	Mid to late 18th century	The house is in colourwashed brick, and has a pantile roof with raised coped gables on kneelers. There are two storeys and three bays. The doorway has pilasters and a fanlight, and the windows are sashes.	II
22 South Street; 53.78009°N 0.41683°W	—	Late 18th century	The house is in brick, and has a slate roof with raised coped gables on kneelers. There are two storeys and three bays, and a single-storey two-bay wing on the left. The central doorway has pilasters, and a fanlight with Gothic glazing bars. The windows are sashes, those on the ground floor of the main block and on the wing have cambered channelled lintels with raised keystone.	II
Stable and coach house, Eastgate House; 53.77916°N 0.40878°W		Late 18th century	The building is in red brick, and has a slate roof with coped gables. There is a single storey and a loft, and two bays. On the ground floor are doorways and a sash window under a wedge lintel, and above are two blank oval panels in gauged brick surrounds. On the gable end facing the street is a blocked coach entrance, above which is a round-headed opening and an impost band.	II
Green Wickets, gates and railings 53.77901°N 0.40364°W		c. 1780	The house is in red brick, and has a hipped slate roof. There are two storeys and attics, and five bays. In the centre is an Ionic porch, and a doorway with a radial Gothic glazed fanlight. To its left is a square bay window, the other windows are sashes with channelled wedge lintels, and there is a roof dormer. In front of the garden is a low coped limestone wall on which are railings, the standards with urn finials. The gate piers are square and rusticated, with cornices, and between are cast iron gates with ramped tops.	II
Newgate House and gate piers 53.77915°N 0.41028°W		c. 1784	The house is in white brick, with stone dressings, a floor band, a sill band, a mutule cornice, a low coped parapet, and a slate roof with coped gables. The main range has two storeys and five bays, and is flanked by single-bay wings, the left with one storey and the right with two. In the centre is a semicircular porch with columns, and a doorway containing a fanlight with radial glazing in a panelled soffit and reveals. The windows are sashes under cambered wedge lintels. The wings contain round-headed sash windows, and each has a corner pilaster with an urn. There are two pairs of rusticated gate piers, each with a band, a moulded cornice and a ball finial.	II
Eastgate House; 53.77895°N 0.40878°W		Late 1780s	The house is in red brick, with a bracketed eaves cornice, and a slate roof with raised coped gables on shaped kneelers. There are two storeys and five bays, with later extensions on the right and at the rear. The doorway has fluted columns and capitals, a fanlight with radial glazing, and a low pediment. The windows are sashes with wedge lintels and raised keystones.	II
Beech House; 53.78420°N 0.41622°W	—	Late 18th to early 19th century	The house is in brick, with a mutule eaves cornice, and a hipped slate roof. There are two storeys and three bays. The central doorway has pilasters, a radial fanlight and an open pediment. It is flanked by square bay windows with casements, and the upper floor contains sash windows with wedge lintels.	II
Tower on Castle Hill; 53.77654°N 0.44862°W		c. 1815	A folly in Gothic style, it is in white brick on the exterior and red brick on the interior, with stone dressings, and is on a plinth. It has a moulded floor band, an eaves band, and an embattled parapet. There is an octagonal plan and two storeys. On the ground floor is a blocked square-headed doorway with a hood mould under a shield, and slit windows, and the upper floor contains oblong windows under a continuous hood mould.	II
Zion United Reformed Church; 53.78181°N 0.41735°W		1819	The church is in white brick on a plinth, with stone dressings, a sill band, a floor band, a moulded cornice, a low pediment containing a dated and inscribed circular tablet, and a slate roof. There are two storeys and three bays, and flanking lower wings with ramped coped parapets. On each wing is a round-arched doorway and a fanlight with radial glazing. The windows are sashes with round-arched heads and radial glazing in round-arched recesses.	II*
The Manse; 53.78185°N 0.41756°W		c. 1820	The house is in white brick on a plinth, with stone dressings, a sill band, and a hipped slate roof. There are two storeys and three bays. The central doorway has pilasters, and a fanlight in panelled reveals and soffit. The windows are sashes under cambered wedge lintels with alternate raised segments.	II
Springfield; 53.77813°N 0.39785°W	—	Early 19th century	The house is rendered and colourwashed, with vemiculated quoins, sill bands, and a hipped tile roof. There are two storeys and three bays, and flanking single-bay wings. The doorway has attached Tuscan columns and a pediment, and the windows are sashes under wedge lintels with alternating raised segments. On the wings are ramped coped parapets ending in pilasters carrying urns.	II
Elmtree House; 53.78071°N 0.41596°W		1834	The house, later used for other purposes, is in stone at the fron and in white brick elsewhere, on a moulded plinth, with stone dressings, rusticated quoins, a sill band, a moulded band under a mutule cornice and blocking course, and a hipped tile roof. The main range has two storeys and three bays, flanked by pedimented cross-wings. In the centre is an unfluted Greek Doric porch and a doorway with a fanlight, flanked by rectangular bay windows with pilasters, a frieze, a cornice and a blocking course. On the upper floor are casement windows in eared architraves. The cross-wings have French windows in architraves, each under a segmental pediment on consoles, with foliage and shields in the tympanum.	II
Cottingham railway station 53.78160°N 0.40644°W		1834	The station was designed by G. T. Andrews for the York and North Midland Railway. It is in red brick on a plinth, with stone dressings, a sill band, oversailing eaves and a hipped slate roof. There is a single storey and six bays. The windows are sashes under cambered gauged brick arches, and on the platform front are four doors under segmental brick gauged arches.	II
Goods shed, Cottingham railway station 53.78246°N 0.40666°W		1846	The goods shed was designed by G. T. Andrews for the York and North Midland Railway. It is in brown brick, with stone dressings, oversailing eaves, and a hipped slate roof. There is a single storey with attics, and four bays. It contains four loading arches under round gauged brick arches with an impost band, and between them are smaller round-headed openings with louvres. The loft has loading doors with segmental arches.	II
Station-master's house, Cottingham railway station 53.78184°N 0.40649°W		1846	The house was designed by G. T. Andrews for the York and North Midland Railway. It is in red brick on a stone plinth, with a sill band, oversailing eaves and a slate roof. There are two storeys and an L-shaped plan. The doorway in the angle has pilasters and a fanlight. The windows are sashes, some under cambered gauged brick arches, and there is a canted bay window.	II
Arlington Hall; 53.78178°N 0.41206°W		Mid-19th century	The church hall is in grey brick, with stone dressings and a slate roof. There is a single storey, five bays along the sides, and an entrance front with a raised coped gable on kneelers. The central doorway has a pointed head, a chamfered surround and a hood mould, above it is a triangular window with a traceried star, and it is flanked by trefoil-headed lancet windows with hood moulds. Along the right side are five pointed windows with Y-tracery and hood moulds.	II
Mark Kirby's Free School; 53.78183°N 0.41174°W		1861	The building is in grey brick, with rusticated quoins, oversailing eaves, and a slate roof with crested ridge tiles. There is a single storey and three bays. On the left bay is a doorway with a pointed surround, and the other bays have pointed windows with Y-tracery.	II
Church, De la Pole Hospital; 53.76981°N 0.44757°W		1880–85	The church at a former mental hospital, later a crematorium, is in red brick, with dressings in stone and blue brick, and slate roofs. It is in Early English style, with pointed arched windows and hood moulds. The church consists of a nave with porches, a south transept and organ chamber, a chancel and a south bell turret. The bell turret has a square brick lower stage, on which is a round stone stage with arcading and a spire.	II
Downs Hall, The Lawns; 53.78853°N 0.42721°W		1963–67	A hall of residence built for the University of Hull. It is in grey and buff brick, and concrete, with timber roofs. There are three storeys and a basement, with five obliquely angled blocks of five stepped bays projecting out in a rough triangle to the central block. Each study room has a balcony with a thick brick balustrade.	II*
Grant Hall, The Lawns; 53.78886°N 0.42770°W		1963–67	A hall of residence built for the University of Hull. It is in grey and buff brick, and concrete, with timber roofs. There are three storeys and a basement, with five obliquely angled blocks of five stepped bays projecting out in a rough triangle to the central block. Each study room has a balcony with a thick brick balustrade.	II*
Lambert Hall, The Lawns; 53.78682°N 0.42602°W		1963–67	A hall of residence built for the University of Hull. It is in grey and buff brick, and concrete, with timber roofs. There are three storeys and a basement, with five obliquely angled blocks of five stepped bays projecting out in a rough triangle to the central block. Each study room has a balcony with a thick brick balustrade.	II*
Morgan Hall, The Lawns; 53.78800°N 0.42647°W		1963–67	A hall of residence built for the University of Hull. It is in grey and buff brick, and concrete, with timber roofs. There are three storeys and a basement, with five obliquely angled blocks of five stepped bays projecting out in a rough triangle to the central block. Each study room has a balcony with a thick brick balustrade.	II*
Nicholson Hall, The Lawns; 53.78742°N 0.42623°W	—	1963–67	A hall of residence built for the University of Hull. It is in grey and buff brick, and concrete, with timber roofs. There are three storeys and a basement, with five obliquely angled blocks of five stepped bays projecting out in a rough triangle to the central block. Each study room has a balcony with a thick brick balustrade.	II*
Reckitt Hall, The Lawns; 53.78830°N 0.42788°W		1963–67	A hall of residence built for the University of Hull. It is in grey and buff brick, and concrete, with timber roofs. There are three storeys and a basement, with five obliquely angled blocks of five stepped bays projecting out in a rough triangle to the central block. Each study room has a balcony with a thick brick balustrade.	II*
