= Cottingham House =

Historic house in Louisiana, United States

- U.S. National Register of Historic Places
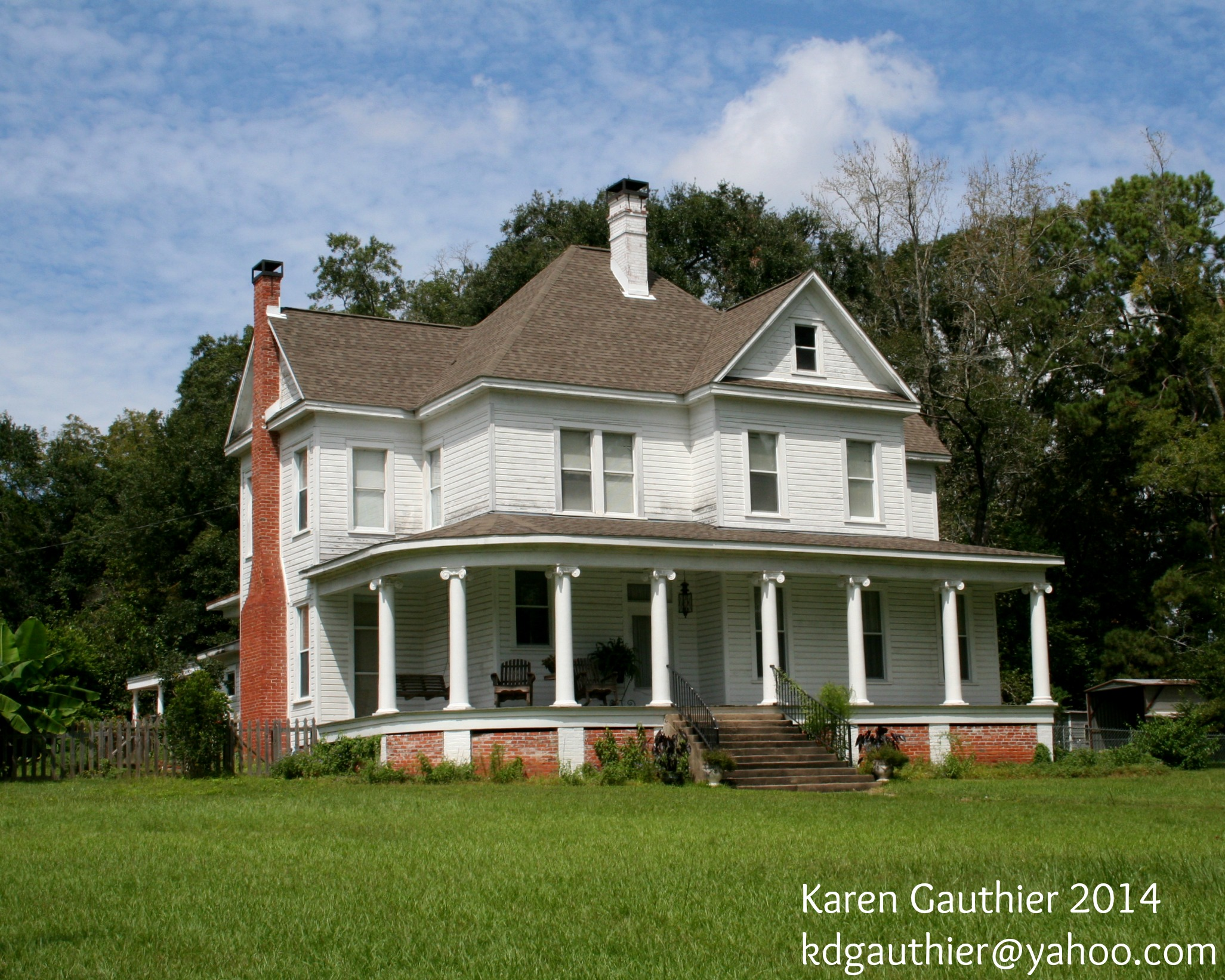

- Location within Louisiana Location within the United States
- Location: 1403 College Dr., Pineville, Louisiana
- Coordinates: 31°19′41″N 92°25′32″W
- Area: 1.2 acres (0.49 ha)
- Built: 1907
- Architectural style: Colonial Revival, Queen Anne
- NRHP reference No.: 87001477
- Added to NRHP: September 8, 1987

Cottingham House is located in Pineville, Louisiana. It was added to the National Register of Historic Places on September 8, 1987.

The house was built in 1907 for Dr. and Mrs. Claybrook Cottingham. Dr. Cottingham was one of three faculty of Louisiana Christian University; he served as president of the college from 1910 to 1941. According to its NRHP nomination, the house's "impressive size and multi-gable roofline marks it as the distinctive landmark among Pineville's earliest surviving period of residential architecture."
