= Cottingham Springboard Festival =

Music festival in the East Riding of Yorkshire, England

- Genre: Unsigned, Rock, Indie, Acoustic,
- Dates: May
- Locations: Cottingham, East Riding of Yorkshire, England
- Years active: 2006-present
- Website: Springboardfestival.org

Cottingham Springboard Festival is a live grassroots music festival that takes place annually in the village of Cottingham, East Riding of Yorkshire, England.

== History ==
The first Cottingham Springboard Festival was created as an afternoon and evening music event. It took place on 12 August 2006 in the Old Brewery Room of the King William IV public house in Cottingham.

In 2007 the festival was expanded to a full weekend, and in 2008 had spread to five venues. The festival gave rise to a spin-off event Springboard Monthly, an evening with new and developing acts which ran until 2011 at the King William IV .

By 2010 Springboard was being held across six venues: The King William IV, The Blue Bell, The Duke of Cumberland, The Hallgate Tavern, The Cross Keys and The Railway Hotel) with eight amplified and managed stages and open mic and busking areas. For 2011 The Black Prince venue joined in the festival, taking the place of the Railway Hotel.

In 2011, BBC Radio Humberside broadcast a two-hour live programme from the Springboard Festival.

In 2014 the event was held within seven village public houses, and involved two hundred acts, particularly those from Hull and the East Riding.

In 2015, the tenth year of the festival, Cottingham Civic Hall was added to the event, now of ten venues and twelve official stages: Cottingham Civic Hall's two stages, The King William IV, The Blue Bell, The Duke of Cumberland's two stages, The Hallgate Tavern, The Cross Keys, The Railway, C.C.Coffee cafe, Woksoever restaurant, and the Olive Garden cafe. Kristoff's restaurant in the village provides a fringe line-up of music.

In 2020, the bands played virtually at the festival.

== Performers ==
The festival presents on average around 200 acts each year, being new performers, local performers, or experienced and well-known acts. At least one international act has performed each year including those from Canada, Senegal, Tasmania and Australia. French-based American bluesman Adrian Byron Burns (Bill Wyman's Rhythm Kings), has been a frequent contributor to the event. At the 2009 festival the Blue Bell venue was compered by the Hull Blokes comedy collective. The 2010 festival was involved in the launch of a CD by a number of festival performers as part of the Larkin 25 project, which marked the 25th anniversary of the death of the poet Philip Larkin.
