= Thomas de Cottingham =

English cleric and judge

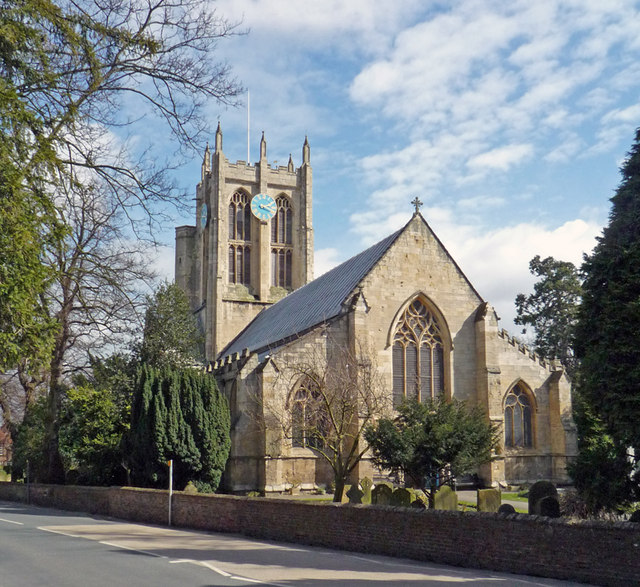
Church of St. Mary in Cottingham, Thomas's birthplace

Thomas de Cottingham (c. 1300 – 1370) was an English-born cleric and judge who held the office of Master of the Rolls in Ireland.

He took his name from his birthplace, Cottingham, in the East Riding of Yorkshire. Hugh de Cottingham, who was also a royal clerk (living 1375) may have been a relative. Thomas served as a clerk in the English Chancery for more than 30 years, and was Keeper of the Great Seal in 1349. He held the livings of several parishes, of which the names of three are known for certain: these are St. Mary the Great, Cambridge, St. Andrew, Holborn (1343), Ashby St Mary, Norfolk and Plumstead, Kent, now part of the London Borough of Greenwich. An undated letter to Thomas in his capacity as vicar of Plumstead from the Archdeacon of Norfolk, possibly written in the early 1330s, concerning demands made by the Archdeacon and his officials, survives and is in the National Archives. This suggests that Thomas was not an absentee vicar but was actually living in Plumstead at the time.

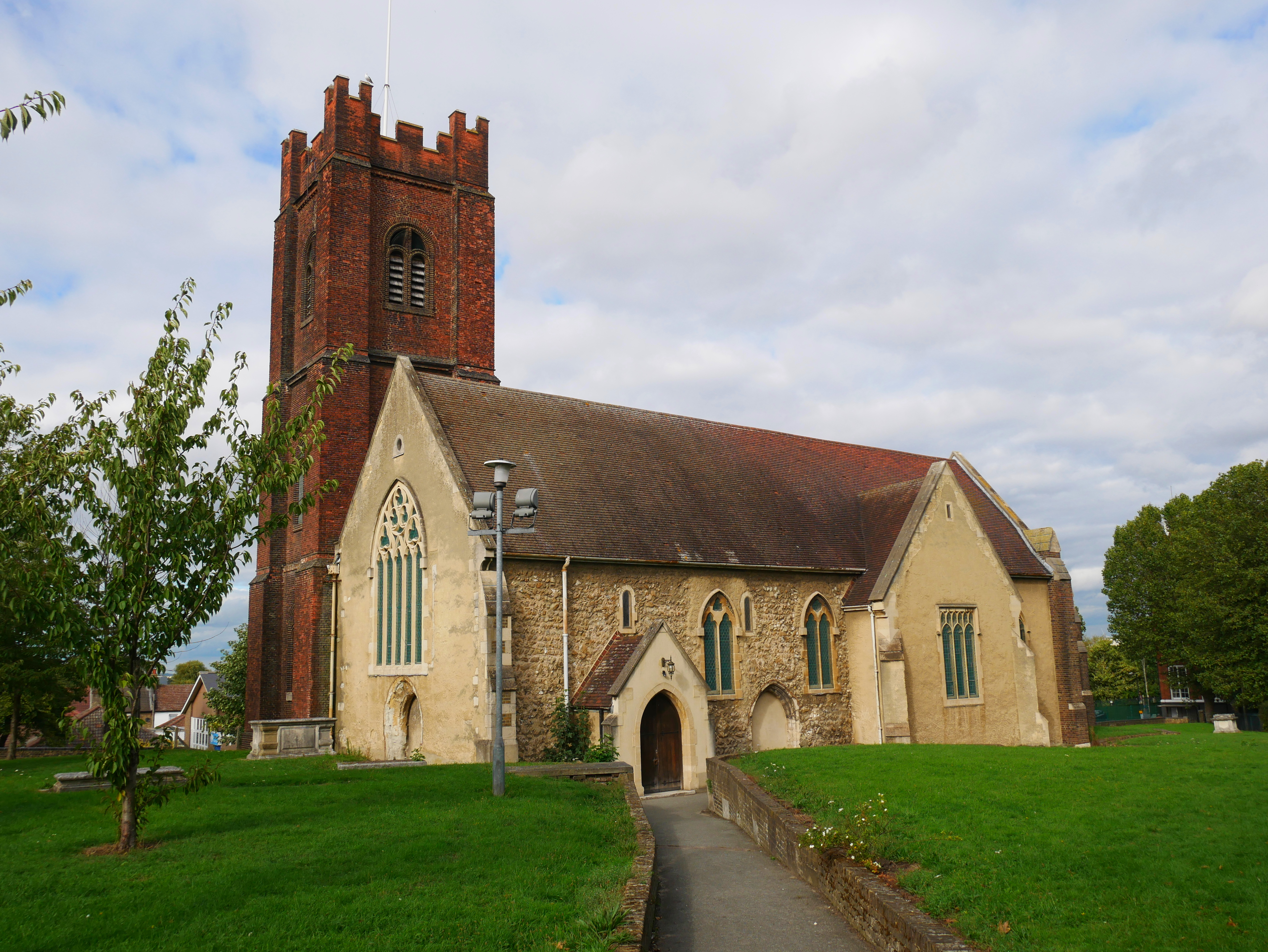
Church of St Nicholas, Plumstead. There is a surviving letter to Thomas as vicar from the Archdeacon.

Sometime after 1368, he became Master of the Rolls in Ireland. His superiors clearly expected him to find it a thankless task since he was promised preferment both for his past services and "the labours which he would have to endure". He was promoted to the rank of clerk of the first degree in Chancery, and subsequently became a Master in Chancery, but it does not seem that he received any more substantial reward for his services in Ireland.

He did not lack friends in the Dublin Government, and in 1356, during a period of confusion about clerical promotions, he was appointed joint prebendary of Kilmolran and Desart, in the Diocese of Lismore. However, his opponents objected to the appointment as irregular and in 1357 King Edward III cancelled it.

He was at Westminster, in attendance on the King, in February 1369: the Gascon Rolls note briefly that he "received the attorneys". He died in 1370.

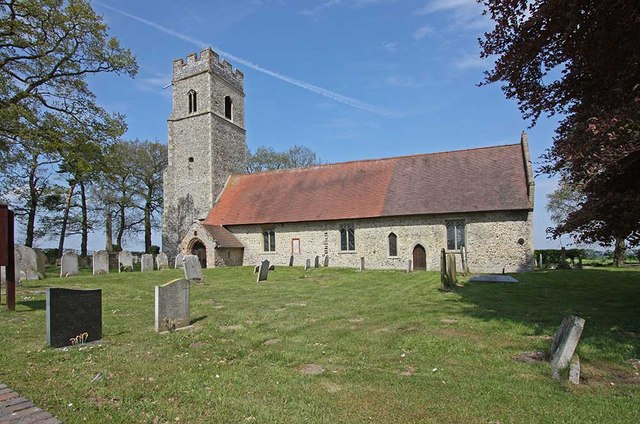
St Mary, Ashby St Mary, of which Thomas became rector in 1349
