= Cottingham railway station =

Railway station in the East Riding of Yorkshire, England

Cottingham
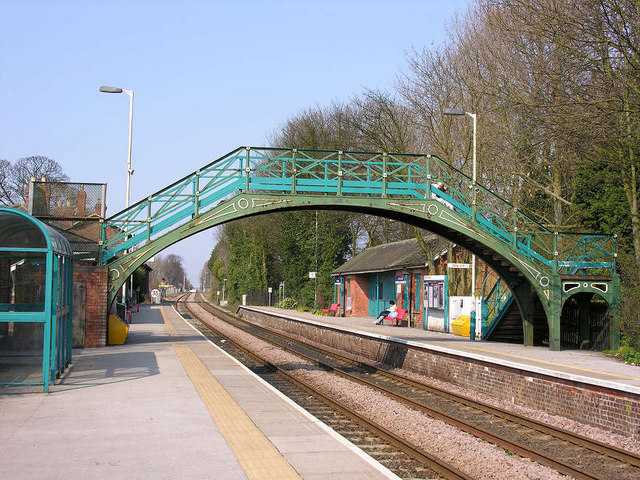

General information
- Location: Cottingham, East Riding of Yorkshire; England
- Coordinates: 53.781702°N 0.406376°W
- Grid reference: TA051328
- Managed by: Northern Trains
- Platforms: 2

Other information
- Station code: CGM
- Classification: DfT category F1

History
- Opened: 6 October 1846

Passengers
- 2020/21: ▼40,218
- 2021/22: ▲0.162 million
- 2022/23: ▲0.211 million
- 2023/24: ▲0.258 million
- 2024/25: ▲0.318 million
Location
Notes
- Passenger statistics from the Office of Rail and Road

Cottingham railway station serves the village of Cottingham in the East Riding of Yorkshire, England. Located on the Yorkshire Coast Line, it is managed by Northern. The station serves the northern suburbs of Hull and generates much commuter traffic.

== History ==
The station was opened, along with the rest of the line from the original Hull and Selby Railway station at Manor House Street, Hull, on 6 October 1846.

The station building was designed by George Andrews, consisting of two platforms, a stationmaster's house, and waiting rooms. In addition to the passenger facilities there was a goods shed, and coal depot to the west of the line, reached by points to the north of the station. Goods transit into Cottingham included coal and building materials, whilst goods outwards from Cottingham included large amounts of agricultural produce as well as livestock. Goods traffic ended in 1970.

Halfway between Cottingham and Hull, a junction was created when a direct line was opened to the new York and North Midland Railway terminus at Hull in 1848. The original line south of Cottingham (later known as the Newington branch) was subsequently utilised as a direct route towards Brough and points west, bypassing the busy station at Paragon for through trains to and from the coast, and was particularly busy in the summer months but was closed to all traffic in May 1965 to allow the removal of several inconvenient level crossings along its route, leaving the 1848 line to handle all remaining services.

In 1988, the stationmaster's house, the station itself and the former goods shed were listed as a Grade II listed buildings. The footbridge on the station platform is of a standard NER cast iron pre-assembled design. The footbridge was restored by Network Rail in 2021.

== Facilities ==
The station is not staffed, but does have a ticket machine available. There is a substantial brick shelter on platform one and two waiting shelters on platform two (the buildings on platform two are in private hands). Passenger information screens are provided for train running details, along with timetable posters. Step-free access to platform two is available from the station entrance, but that for platform one requires the use of the nearby level crossing (a 330-yard (300 m) walk from one platform to the other).

== Services ==
All trains on the Hull to Bridlington and Scarborough Line call here, giving the station a basic half-hourly service in each direction with several additional peak hour trains to and from Beverley. There is an hourly service each way on Sundays throughout the year since the December 2009 timetable change (see GB National Rail Timetable 43), with nine trains in each direction through to/from Scarborough. Many Hull-bound services continue onward to either Sheffield via Doncaster or York via Selby since the December 2019 timetable was introduced.

From 21 May 2017, the station began being served by one Hull Trains service to London King's Cross in the morning and Beverley in the evening. Since May 2019, this has been increased to two trains per day.

Preceding station	National Rail	Following station
Hull Paragon	Hull Trains; Yorkshire Coast Line	Beverley
Hull Paragon	Northern Trains; Yorkshire Coast Line	Beverley

== See also ==
- Listed buildings in Cottingham, East Riding of Yorkshire
