= Henry Cottingham =

Anglican priest in Ireland

Henry Cottingham was an Anglican priest in Ireland during the 17th century.

Cottingham was educated at Trinity College, Dublin. He was the incumbent at Ardbraccan for many years; and Dean of Clonmacnoise from 1668 until 1681. In 1681 Cottingham became Archdeacon of Meath, holding the post until his death on 20 February 1698.
