= Ashby St Mary =

Village in Norfolk, England

Coordinates: 52.567°N 01.436°E

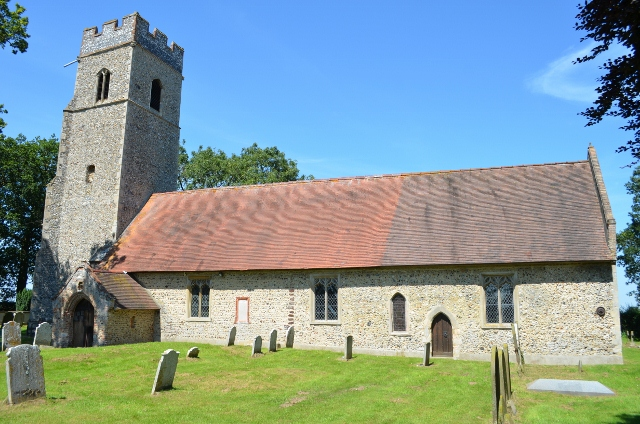
- St Mary's Church, Ashby St Mary

- Location within Norfolk
- Area: 2.03 km^{2} (0.78 sq mi)
- Population: 316 (2011)
  - Density: 156/km^{2} (400/sq mi)
- OS grid reference: TG3202
- District: South Norfolk
- Shire county: Norfolk
- Region: East
- Country: England
- Sovereign state: United Kingdom
- Post town: Norwich
- Postcode district: NR14
- Police: Norfolk
- Fire: Norfolk
- Ambulance: East of England

Ashby St Mary, historically Ascebei, is a small village and civil parish in the English county of Norfolk. The civil parish has an area of 2.03 square kilometres (0.78 sq mi) and in the 2001 census had a population of 297 in 115 households, the population increasing to 316 in 120 households at the 2011 Census. For the purposes of local government, the parish falls within the district of South Norfolk.

The village contains a number of heritage-listed buildings, which include a 13th-century church, a war memorial, and an early 18th-century hall, barn and garden house.

== Location ==
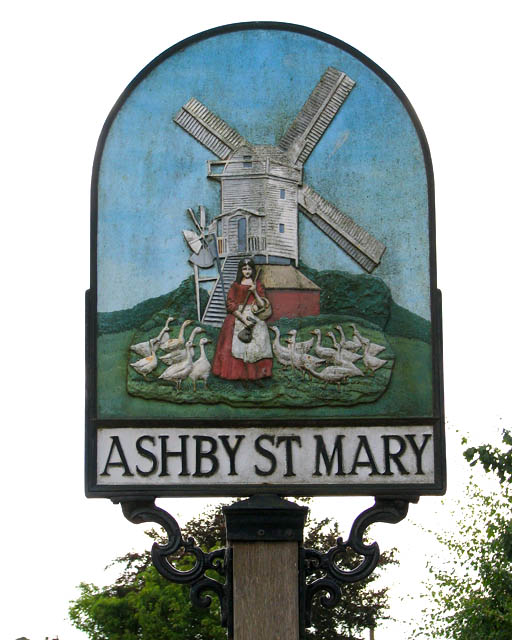
Ashby St Mary's village sign

The village is situated 7 1/2 miles (12.1 km) south-east of Norwich and 1 mile (1.6 km) north of Thurton, with Claxton (to the north), Hellington (to the west) and Carleton St Peter (to the east) all lying a similar distance away. The church has a high tower, a long, low nave, and an impressive Norman doorway. A tombstone in the graveyard depicts a husband and wife (George and Ann Basey) feeding their turkeys and geese; Ann's carving is repeated on the village sign, which was commissioned in 2000 to celebrate the millennium. It also depicts a windmill which stood in the village until at least 1916.

=== Geography ===
Ashby's topography is, like most of East Anglia, made up of river meadows and flat agricultural landscape. The geology mostly consists of Cainozoic Sedimentary rock, with a layer of boulder clay and sand laid down in the last ice age. Ashby St Mary has slightly acidic loamy and clayey soils with impeded drainage, and low carbon. The cropping of Ashby is reasonably flexible but more suited to autumn sown crops and grassland.

== History ==
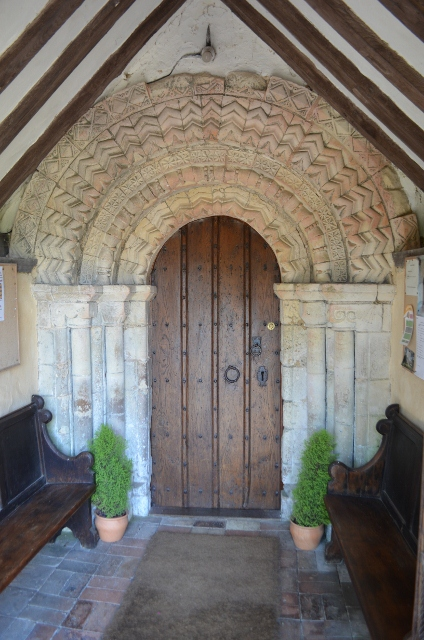
Ashby St Mary's Norman doorway

Ashby St Mary, originally called Ascebei has existed for roughly a millennium, as it was recorded in the Domesday Book as;

"Ascebei / As(s)ebei:
Roger Bigot; Godric the steward."

The village of Ashby St Mary has existed since the late Saxon era, however, compared to other nearby areas, there was not much activity in the area beforehand, however there is a Bronze Age ringditch, and a Neolithic arrowhead. Thomas de Cottingham, a royal clerk who later became Master of the Rolls in Ireland was appointed rector of Ashby in 1349: he was notorious for pluralism. Ashby Lodge was built in 1788 for the surgeon general of the East India Company, with a lined facade. Ashby Hall is an early 18th-century country house, but originally there was an older, more elaborate house on the site, there is also a late 17th-century garden house situated nearby, they are now separate private residences. The village used to be situated in the Loddon Hundred.

=== St. Mary's church ===
Lending its name to the village, St Mary's church was first built sometime before 1186, in the late Anglo-Saxon era, however, only the foundations of the original church still exists. The nave of the church is Norman, and still retains the typical long low features of a Norman church, the tower is 15th Century, but with later crenellations at the top. The chancel is post 13th century, and the south porch is 16th century, however most of the internal dressings date from the 17th century. Situated in the north of Ashby St Mary, St Mary's church is notable for its Norman doorway, thought to have been carved by the same master mason as both Mundham's St. Peter, and Heckingham's St. Gregory.

The Rectors of St. Mary's date back to the late 13th century, starting with Henry de Lenn in 12--, all the way to Christopher Ellis in 2015. The east-facing window at the head of the chancel has many stained glass elements, and one of the south chancel windows is one of many recreations of The Light of the World used in many East Anglian Churches. Other parts of the church include; the organ, which is medium-sized and was overhauled in 1962, and the Ten Commandments, located at the head of the chancel, are based on the Institutes of the Christian Religion (1536) by John Calvin.

The Church was used in October 2010 by Music composer Jamie Robertson who along with the Poringland Singers Choir recorded an incidental soundtrack to the Big Finish Productions story Doctor Who Relative Dimensions (with Paul McGann, Jake McGann, Carole Ann Ford and Niky Wardley).

=== Ashby St Mary mill ===
Ashby St Mary post mill was built c.1758 and remained working for over 150 years. Located on Ashby Common, the mill had a roundhouse and had a 75-foot diameter footprint. The buck had a gallery at the eaves, a balcony porch with a gable end roof. The mill house was sunk one floor below ground level in order to not block wind from the mill. An auxiliary steam engine had been installed by 1900. It continued running up until at least 1906. The mill is first shown on the 1797 Faden's map, and also appears again on both the Bryants map in 1826, and the Greenwoods map in 1834.

=== Listed buildings ===
Within Ashby St Mary, there are five listed buildings, all of which are Grade II listed.

Name	Grading	Description
St Mary's Church	Grade II*	12th Century Church (With later additions)
Ashby St Mary War Memorial	Grade II	War Memorial, erected c.1920
Ashby Hall	Grade II	Early 18th Century Country house, including Northern boundary wall
Ashby Hall Barn	Grade II	Barn, built 1736
Ashby Hall Garden House	Grade II	Late 17th Century Garden house

== Demographics ==
Year	Houses	Families	Population	Males	Females	Area (Acres)
1801	--	--	186	90	96	---
1811	--	--	197	91	106	---
1821	--	--	234	110	124	---
1831	57	--	218	119	99	640
1841	59	--	263	128	135	---
1851	58	--	249	129	120	487
1861	--	--	---	---	---	487
1871	--	--	---	---	---	487
1881	56	--	200	97	103	487
1891	55	--	176	81	95	503
1901	46	41	176	91	85	503
1911	46	47	174	91	83	503
1921	46	47	178	89	89	503
1931	48	48	165	83	82	503
1941	--	--	---	82	---	503
1951	51	51	163	81	82	503
1961	59	59	172	87	85	503
