= Castle Hill Hospital =

Hospital in the East Riding of Yorkshire, England

- Hull University Teaching Hospitals NHS Trust
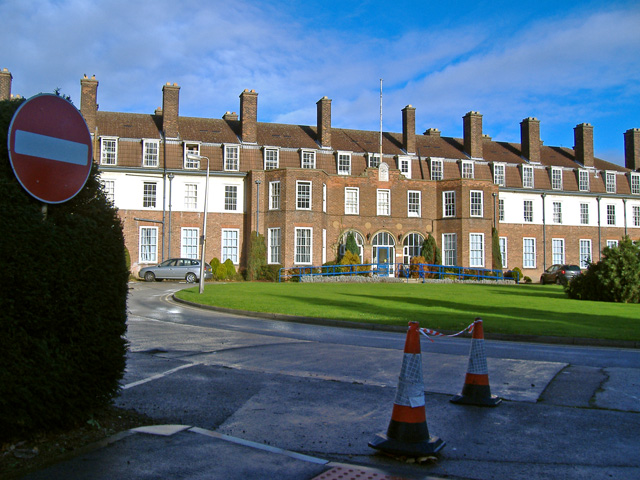
- Castle Hill Hospital

- Shown in the East Riding of Yorkshire

Geography
- Location: Cottingham, East Riding of Yorkshire, England
- Coordinates: 53.777000°N 0.445000°W

Organisation
- Care system: NHS

Services
- Emergency department: No

History
- Founded: 1916

Links
- Lists: Hospitals in England

Castle Hill Hospital is an NHS hospital to the west of Cottingham, East Riding of Yorkshire, England, run by Hull University Teaching Hospitals NHS Trust.

== History ==
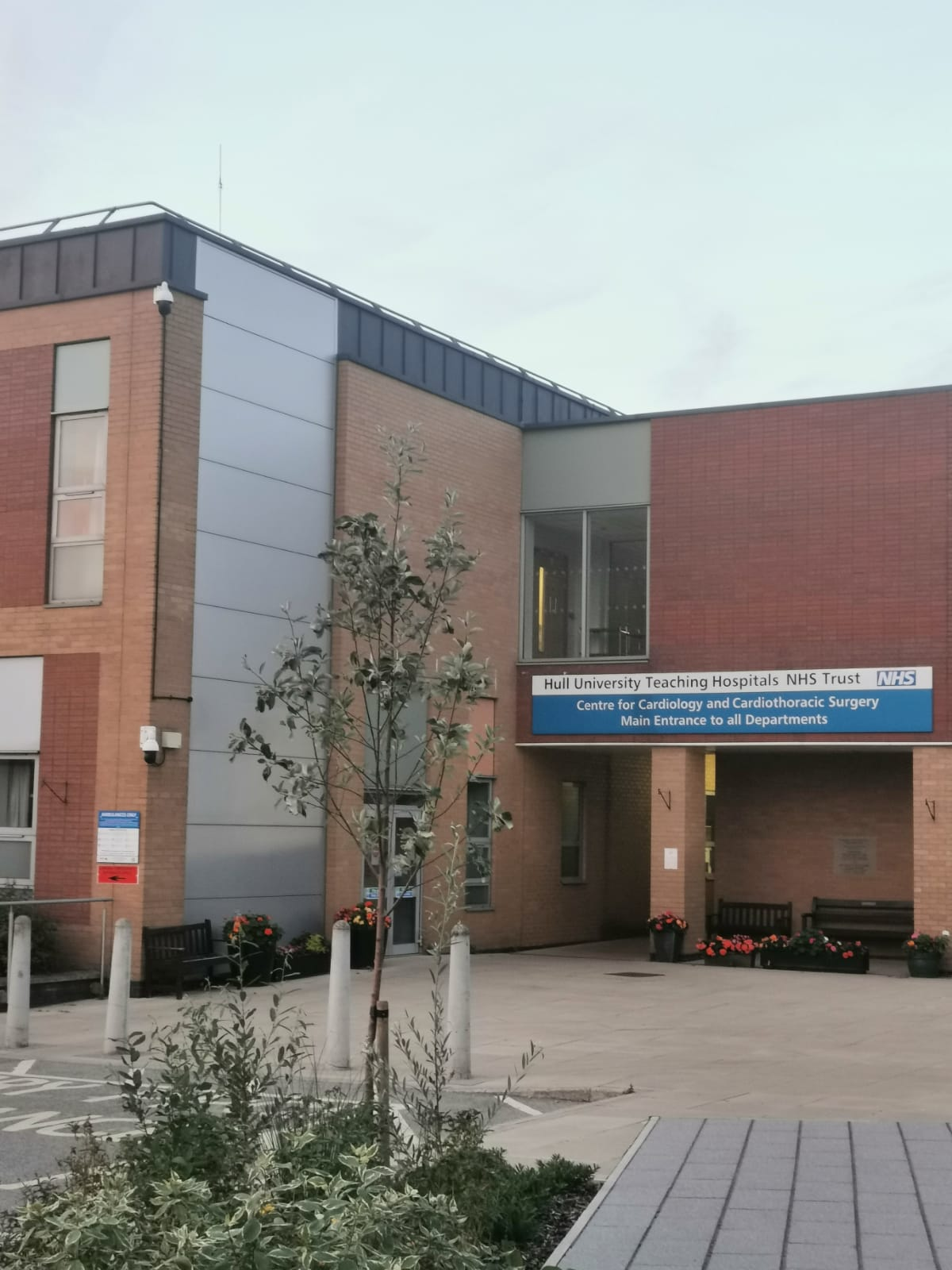
Cardiothoracic building entrance

Hull Sanatorium, designed by Joseph Hirst, was built on the site of Cottingham Castle, a large castellated mansion which had burnt down in 1861, between 1913 and 1916. In 1928 the City Hospital for infectious diseases moved from its original location on Hedon Road to newly erected buildings on the Hull Sanatorium site.

A major expansion of the hospital was procured under a Private Finance Initiative contract in 2005. The Queen's Centre for Oncology and Haematology, which was designed by HLM Architects and built by Shepherd Building Group at a cost of £65 million, was completed in August 2008, and was officially opened by Queen Elizabeth II and Prince Philip, Duke of Edinburgh in March 2009.

In 2022 an 11,000-panel solar farm was installed on site to supply the hospital with enough electricity to cover all of its daytime needs.

== Facilities ==
Castle Hill Hospital is home to the Daisy Building, the headquarters of the Daisy Charity. The charity supports research into cancer, dementia, cardiological and haematological illnesses and respiratory medicine.

== See also ==
- List of hospitals in England
