= Baynard Castle, Cottingham =

Former Medieval castle in Cottingham, East Riding of Yorkshire, England

Coordinates: 53.78293°N 0.42156°W

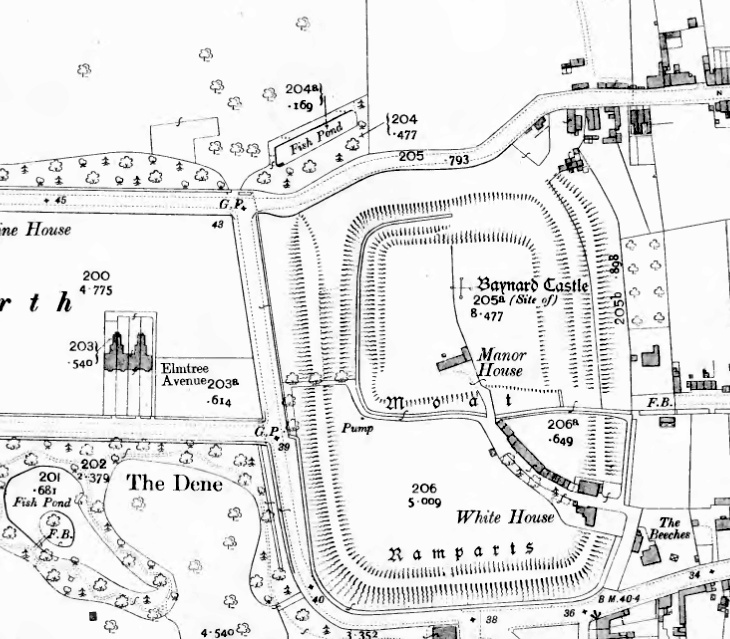
Remains of castle earthworks, 1910, OS map, 25" to 1 mile

Baynard Castle was a moated castle built in the 12th and 13th centuries in the village of Cottingham, East Riding of Yorkshire, England. It was referred to by terms including the 'castle at Cottingham' or 'Stuteville's castle'; the term Baynard Castle is common in 19th-century references and later.

== Description ==
The castle earthworks were rectangular in shape, with a bank and ditch, enclosing approximately 11 acres (4.5 ha), a second line of ditch fortifications protected the northern half of the castle. A keep is postulated to have been in the north-east corner, and the current (2012) entrance to the site in the south-east quadrant is thought to relate to the original entrance.

== History ==
References to a manor house at the castle site in Cottingham date to as early as the 1170s; in 1200 William de Stuteville entertained King John I in Cottingham, receiving permission for a market and to strengthen the castle at Cottingham; in 1201 a licence to fortify was issued to enclose and fortify the site. By 1272 a moat had been built and a boundary wall and double ditch were noted in 1282.

The male line of the de Stutevilles ended in 1233, and the castle was acquired by the le Wake family. Edward I stayed at the castle during Christmas 1299. In 1327 a second licence to crenellate was issued to Thomas Wake, but by the time of his death in 1349 the manor house was said to have fallen into decay.

After Thomas Wake's death ownership of the castle passed via his sister Margaret Wake to the Earles of Kent (and Barons Holand). In 1365 the manor began to be repaired and the construction of a gate was ordered.

The manor of Cottingham was split between three daughters in 1407, after which the castle appears to have fallen out of use, though the gatehouse was rebuilt in 1500–1. John Leland noted farmhouses built within the former castle's bounds in his 1538 itinerary, by 1590 the castle was described by William Camden as a ruin.

Entering into the South Part of the great Uplandisch Town of Cotingham, I saw wher Stutevilles Castelle, dobill dikid and motid, stoode, of the which nothing now remanynith.

— John Leland, itinerary 1538.

=== Manor House ===
A legend exists relating to an earlier manor, supposedly destroyed on the orders of its owner in 1541, who, expecting a visit from King Henry VIII, and fearing the possibility of the King's amorous attentions towards his own wife, not least the effect on his own well-being, ordered the house set fire to, so that he could avoid the monarch's visit. (Note: According to George Oliver (1829), "The history and antiquities of the town and minster of Beverley..", the tale explains the present state of the castle, but he states that the Lord was a de Wake and died without male issue, the land being split between three daughters - however the Lordship of the manor of Cottingham had long passed from the Wakes after Thomas Wake (d.1349) at the time of Henry VIII, and a split of the manor into parts is also dated to a different before Henry VIII in 1407. The story is repeated in other 19th-century literature e.g. Edward Baines (1823), History, directory & gazetteer, of the county of York, Vol.2, and others. In "The History of Cottingham" (1861), Charles Overton notes the chronological contradictions in the tale, concluding "I am compelled by the force of evidence, to consider the tale which has so often been told respecting Henry VIII and Cottingham Castle, as an entire fiction..".)

The current Old Manor House (also known as Sarum Manor) is located in the southern half of the castle, outside the second ditch, and is thought to date to the 16th century, with 20th-century additions and alternations. The building is a two-storey timber-framed building. It is a grade II listed building.

=== Present day ===
The use of the term Baynard Castle is recorded as early as the 19th century. Since 1949 the site of the castle has been a scheduled ancient monument. In addition to the Old Manor House, two other buildings are listed buildings on the castle site, a coach house and associated stable, and 'The White House', both two-storey brick buildings dating to the 18th century located on the path leading to the castle site.

== See also ==
- "Cottingham Castle" was also the name for a 19th-century manor house, built for Thomas Thompson (1754–1828), which burned down in the 1860s and lends its name to Castle Hill Hospital.
