= Cottingham, East Riding of Yorkshire =

Village and civil parish in England

Cottingham
- Village
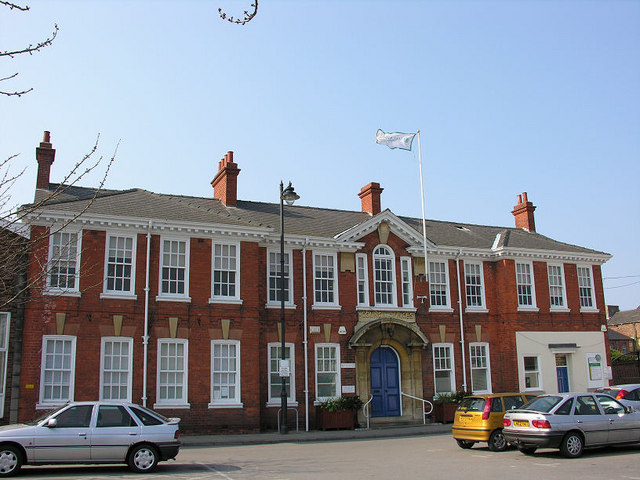
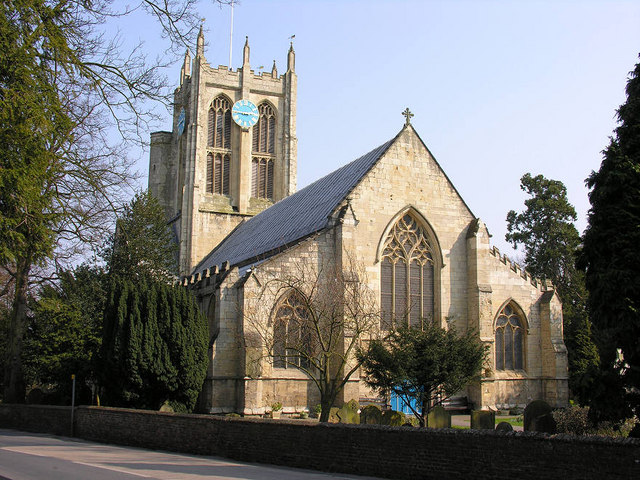
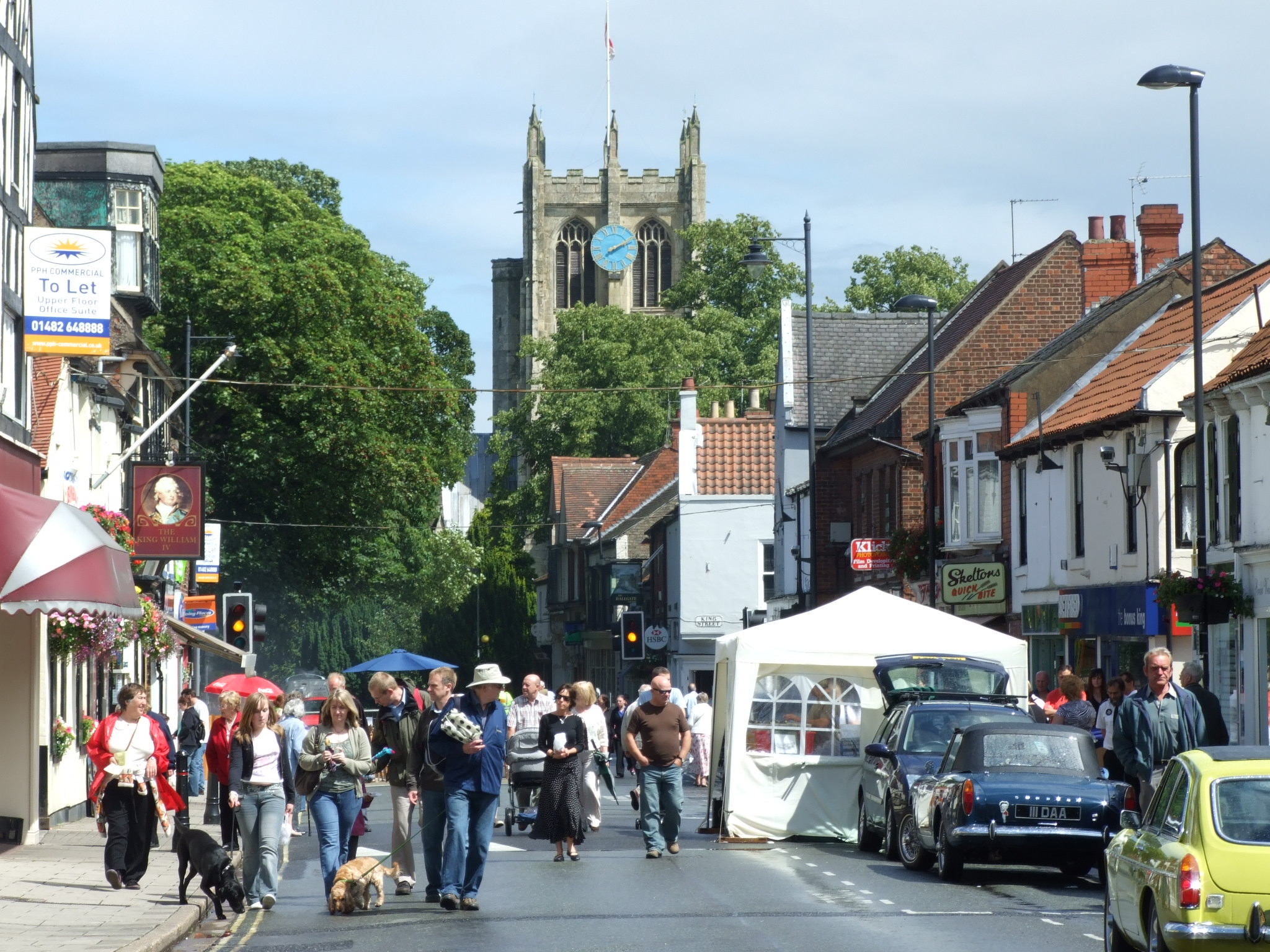
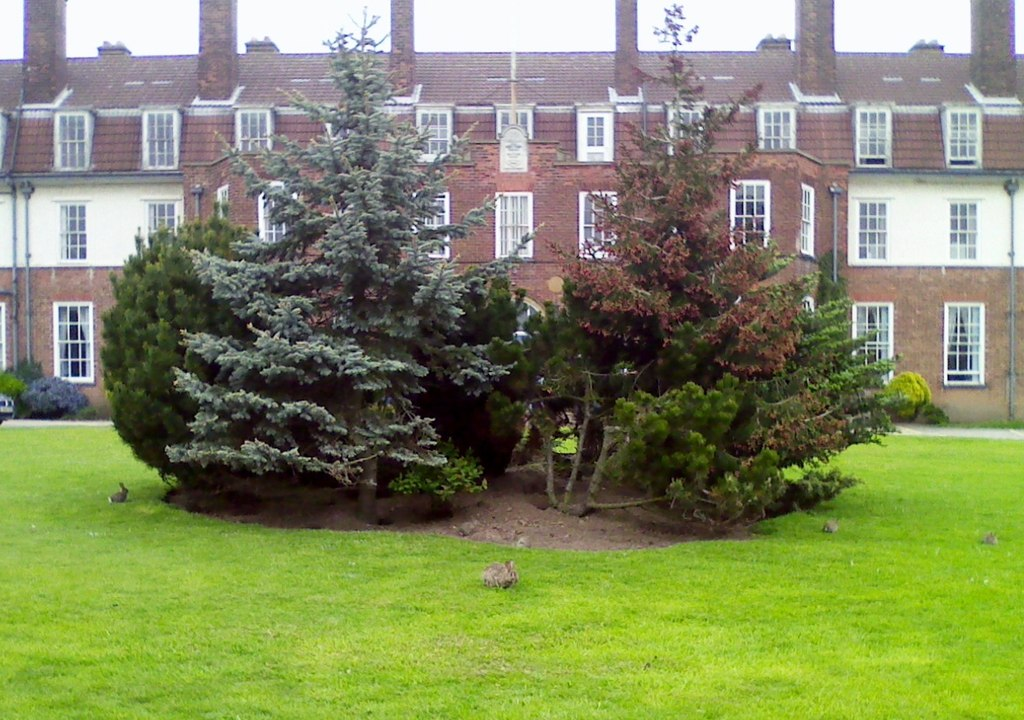
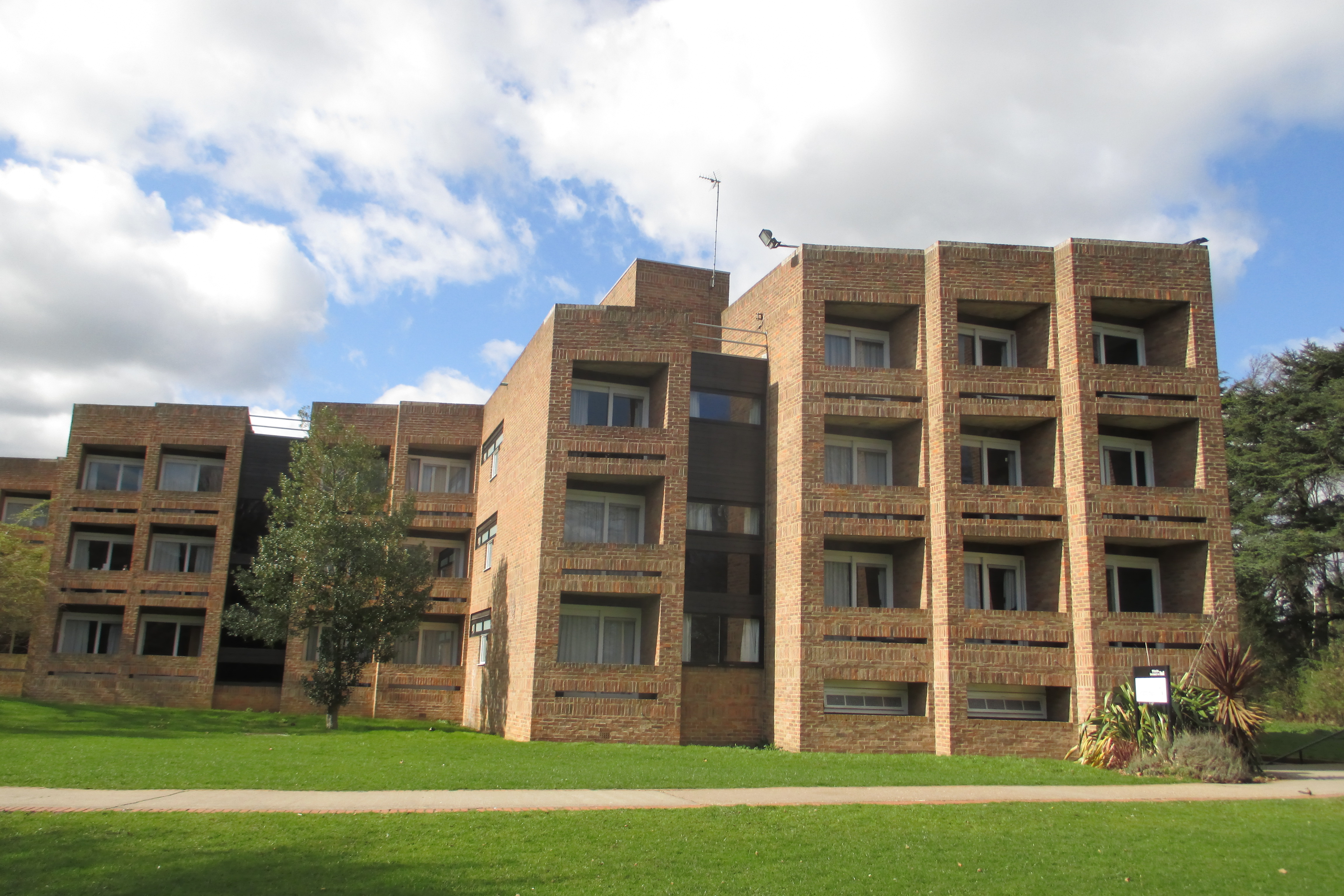
- Council Offices Church of St Mary Hallgate Castle Hill Hospital The Lawns

- Location within the East Riding of Yorkshire
- Population: 17,164 (2011 census)
- OS grid reference: TA046329
  - London: 155 mi (249 km) S
- Civil parish: Cottingham
- Unitary authority: East Riding of Yorkshire
- Ceremonial county: East Riding of Yorkshire
- Region: Yorkshire and the Humber
- Country: England
- Sovereign state: United Kingdom
- Post town: COTTINGHAM
- Postcode district: HU16
- Dialling code: 01482
- Police: Humberside
- Fire: Humberside
- Ambulance: Yorkshire
- UK Parliament: Kingston upon Hull North and Cottingham

Cottingham is a large village and civil parish in the East Riding of Yorkshire, England. It lies 4 miles (6 km) north-west of the centre of Kingston upon Hull, and 6 miles (10 km) south-east of Beverley on the eastern edge of the Yorkshire Wolds. It has two main shopping streets, Hallgate and King Street, which cross each other near the Church of Saint Mary the Virgin, and a market square called Market Green. Cottingham had a population of 17,164 residents in 2011, making it larger by area and population than many towns. As a result, it is one of the villages claiming to be the largest village in England.

== History ==
=== Toponymy ===
The name Cottingham is believed to derive from an Old English man's name Cot(t)a plus -ingaham, meaning the "Homestead/village of Cott's/Cotta's people". Archaic spellings include Cotingeham (Domesday, 1086), and Cotingham, Cottingham and Cotyngham (1150s).

=== Medieval period ===
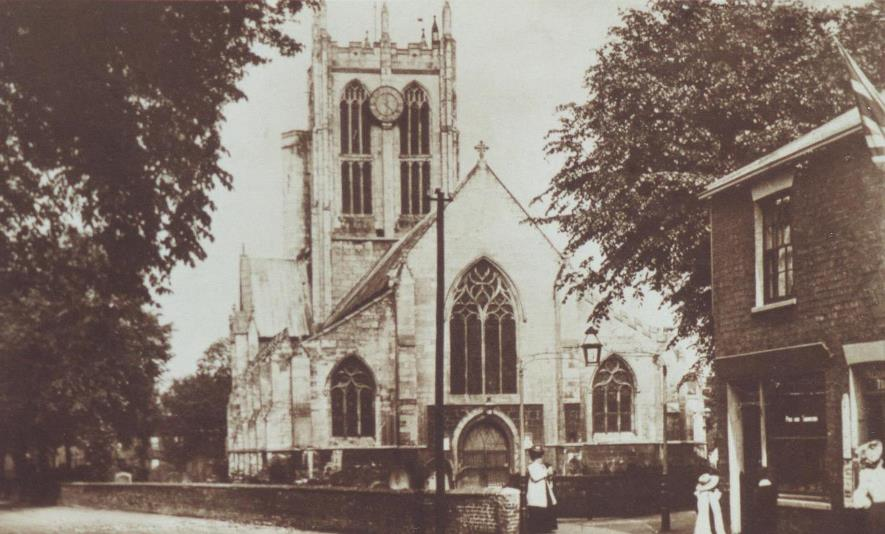
The parish church of St Mary the Virgin, Cottingham in 1900

The pre-Conquest owner of Cottingham was Gamel, the son of Osbert, during the reign of Edward the Confessor in the 11th century. After the Norman Conquest of England the land was in the possession of Hugh fitzBaldric. At this time, the Domesday Book (1086) shows the Cottingham manor included a mill, five fisheries, woodland and farm land. In 1089 the manor was given to Robert Front de Boeuf, founder of the de Stuteville family line. Cottingham was, at this time, in the hundred of Welton in the historic county of Yorkshire.

In 1201, a licence to fortify was obtained by William de Stuteville, marking the beginnings of Baynard Castle. (Note: 53.78293°N 0.42156°W, Site of Baynard Castle) The ownership of the manor passed to the de Wake family through de Stuteville's granddaughter Joan, who married Hugh de Wake. In 1327 further licence to crenellate the castle was given to Thomas Wake. According to legend, the manor house at the castle was destroyed by its owner, in 1541, on account of a proposed visit by Henry VIII; the owner, fearing the monarch's intentions towards his wife, sought to prevent the King's visit by ordering the arson of his own home. To the north-west of the village there was a deer park, first recorded in the 13th century. The park was 4 leagues (12 miles) in circumference and located in the area now known as Cottingham Park, including Crowle Park and Burn Park; it is thought to have fallen out of use and been let for pasture by the 16th century. (Note: 53.796023°N 0.426386°W, former Deer park)

Thomas de Cottingham, Lord Keeper of the Great Seal of England in 1349 and later Master of the Rolls in Ireland, was born in Cottingham in about 1300 and died 1370.

In 1319, Thomas de Wake received a charter allowing Cottingham to have two annual fairs and a weekly market; he also founded an Augustinian priory, licensed in 1320, and built by 1322. Due to potential disputes over the land it was built on, the priory moved to Newton south of Cottingham in 1325, becoming known as Haltemprice Priory. (Note: 53.78418°N 0.408165°W, Cottingham priory)

By 1352, the lordship of Cottingham had passed from the de Wake family through Thomas Wake's sister Margaret Wake, who married Edmund of Woodstock, 1st Earl of Kent (1301–1330) to John, 3rd Earl of Kent (1330–1352). On John's death, the manor passed to Margaret's daughter Joan of Kent ('The Fair Maid of Kent'), from whom the estate passed to Thomas Holland, 2nd Earl of Kent, her eldest son (whose stepfather was Edward the Black Prince). In 1407, with the Holland family line lacking a male heir, Cottingham was divided into three separate manors, known as Cottingham Richmond, Cottingham Westmoreland, and Cottingham Powis – each incorporated into the estates of the Duke of Richmond; the Earl of Westmoreland and Lord Powis through their marriages to Thomas Holland's daughters.

The Anglican parish church, St Mary's Church, Cottingham, was built between 1272 and 1370; it is a large cruciform stone-built church in a mixture of the decorated and perpendicular Gothic styles. The tower was built in the 15th century. (Note: 53.78221°N 0.411616°W, St Mary's church) Nicholas de Luda (died 1382), a capuchin friar, who built or re-built the chancel, is commemorated by a monumental brass in the church. The church was designated a Grade I listed building in 1967.

After 1376, dikes were made to supply water to Kingston upon Hull with fresh water from a source between Cottingham and Anlaby; in 1392, some inhabitants of Cottingham and Anlaby rioted, and about 1,000 people laid siege to Kingston upon Hull, threatening to raze it to the ground. The siege was ultimately unsuccessful with some of the ringleaders hanged at York; their complaint was the extraction of water which they said had deprived them of water, as well the dike having damaged their fields.

After 1402, the water supply of Hull was further improved, bringing more hostility from the surrounding area; the construction of the channel was sabotaged, and the builders attacked; later salt water was let into the Hull supply, and the water was tainted with the carcasses of dead animals. Disputes over the matter continued until resort was made to the Pope (Alexander V), whose successor issued an admonitory letter (20 July 1413), urging them to desist for their own spiritual well-being, after which the nuisance ceased.

=== 1500–1850 ===
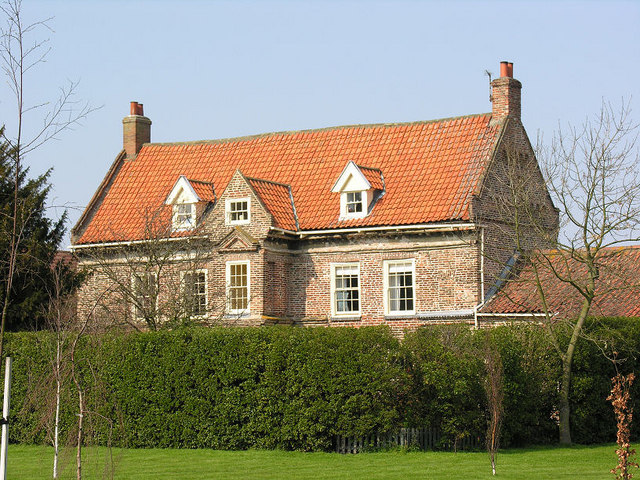
Southwood Hall, built c. 1660 (2007)

By 1661, the manor house of Southwood Hall had been built to the south-east of the village and is now designated a Grade II* listed building. (Note: 53.77602°N 0.425728°W, Southwood Hall, c. 1660, surrounded by 20th century urban development) A schoolhouse was established in the village by John Wardle in around 1666, near to the churchyard. Wardle also established an almshouse adjacent to it, but died in 1668 before it was completed.

In 1712, Mark Kirby left an endowment of land to support the school, renaming the school the Mark Kirby Free School. The church of Saint Mary had pinnacles added to the tower in the 18th century, which may have been strengthened in the same period, other additions included monuments to Ralph Burton (died 1768) and William Burton of Hotham (died 1764). A workhouse, now known as the 'Church House' adjacent to the church grounds was built in 1729 (later modified).

A Georgian villa, later known as 'Kingtree House' was built on King Street around 1750 by Hull merchant Samuel Watson. The gardens were noted by Arthur Young on his tour of northern England (c. 1770). (Note: 53.7804635°N 0.41392538°W, Kingtree House, demolished 1960s.)

"At this place Mr. Watson has a pleasure-ground, which is very well worth seeing; it consists of shrubberies with winding walks, and the imitation of a meandering river through the whole..."

— Arthur Young, A six months tour through the north of England.

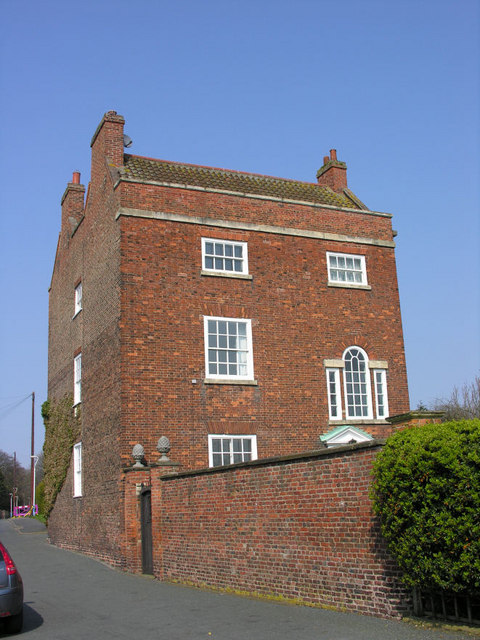
Snuff Mill House, built 1750 (2007)

Snuff was manufactured in the south of the village in the 18th century; towards the end of the century a large mill owned by Quaker William Travis was producing 15 hundredweight of snuff per week. William Travis had a three-storied house built in 1750 next to the mill. (Note: 53.7768°N 0.4084°W, Snuff Mill House)

The road from Cottingham to Hull connected with the Hull to Beverley Road (turnpiked by the Kingston-upon-Hull and Beverley Road Act 1743 (17 Geo. 2. c. 25) of 1744) at Newland toll bar; it was turnpiked as an extension of the Hull to Beverley Road by the Kingston-upon-Hull and Beverley Road Act 1764 (4 Geo. 3. c. 66). A road from Beverley to Hessle, connecting with the Cottingham to Newlands turnpike was turnpiked by the Beverley to Hessle Ferry Turnpike Act 1769 (9 Geo. 3. c. 79).

William Travis also acquired land on Thwaite Street in the 1770s and by 1795 had built Cottingham Hall, one of the largest dwellings in the village; (Note: 53.778129°N 0.407117°W, Cottingham Hall (demolished, mid 20th century)) it joined other substantial houses including Cottingham House (built pre 1744); (Note: 53.779165°N 0.41151°W, Cottingham House (demolished, second half 20th century)) Newgate House (built c. 1784); (Note: 53.77911°N 0.410303°W, Newgate House) Eastgate House (begun 1776); (Note: 53.778886°N 0.408846°W, Eastgate House) Westfield (1778); (Note: Originally Westfield House, built 1778, and extended in the 19th century, later Westfield Country Club, as of 2012 Fair Maid public house.) (Note: 53.781522°N 0.422071°W, Westfield House, later Westfield Country Club, later Fair Maid public house.) 'Green Wickets' (formerly 'Sycamores', built c. 1780s); (Note: 53.778933°N 0.40363°W, The Green Wickets, formerly Sycamores) and Northgate House (later Northfields House, built 1780, extended in 1820). (Note: 53.784495°N 0.414845°W, Northfield or Northgate House, after 1928 part of Hull University, renamed Needler Hall and extended) By the beginning of the 19th century it was noted as:

".. a favourite place of residence for the more opulent portion of the merchants of Hull, ... [with] ..many handsome country houses, gardens and pleasure-grounds."

— Edward Baines,

The population of the village in 1792 was 1178 in 284 houses; in addition to being noted as a desirable place to live, the village was also noted as a centre of market gardening, supplying Hull. Other employment activities included two breweries, and a carpet factory (1811).

Several notable houses and halls were constructed in and around Cottingham at around the turn of the 19th century: to the north-west of the village; Cottingham Grange (built 1801); (Note: 53.78830°N 0.432014°W, Cottingham High School, former site of Cottingham Grange) and the nearby Harland Rise (built c. 1800); south-east of the village, on the road to Hull, Springfield House, (early 19th or last decade of the 18th century); (Note: 53.778059°N 0.397867°W, Springfield House) within the village: Beech House on Northgate; (Note: 53.784104°N 0.416202°W, Beech House, Northgate) and Thwaite House (built between 1803 and 1807). (Note: 53.779173°N 0.400264°W, Thwaite House and associated gardens, later Thwaite Hall, Hull University residence)

In 1814–6, Thomas Thompson (1754–1828) had a large Gothic house built on high ground about 1 mile (2 km) west of Cottingham, having acquired 54 acres (22 ha) of land in 1800; the house became known as Cottingham Castle. (Note: 53.77793°N 0.443773°W, Cottingham Castle, later Castle Hill Hospital) The house burnt down in 1861, although the Castle Hill Tower folly is still extant. (Note: 53.77649°N 0.448625°W, Prospect Tower, Cottingham Castle folly) Thompson also paid for the reconstruction and expansion of a Wesleyan chapel in 1814, (original building built 1803) and was instrumental in the establishment of land set aside for poor families; in 1819 the parish officers reserved 12 acres (4.9 ha) of land, previously used to fund repairs for the church, for the use of twenty families. Originally named Pauper Village, it was renamed "New Village" in 1829. (Note: 53.78174°N 0.39764°W, (Pauper village), New Village)

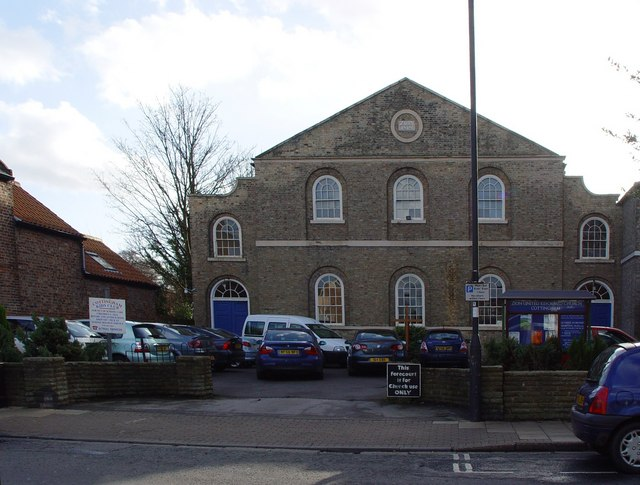
Zion Chapel, built 1819 (2008)

A chapel for the Independents, Zion Chapel, was established in 1819, replacing a pre-1800 Presbyterian building. (Note: 53.781811°N 0.417307°W, Zion Chapel, Hallgate) The chapel is now designated a Grade II* listed building and an adjoining 1802 minister's house is Grade II listed. A Primitive Methodist chapel was constructed in 1828. (Note: 53.782964°N 0.414052°W, ex-Primitive Methodist chapel, King Street) A new Methodist church was built in 1878/9. (Note: 53.782183°N 0.415342°W, Methodist church, 1878/9, Hallgate)

Elmtree House was built in the early 1800s for John Hebblewhite, Hull draper. (Note: Elmtree House, (Note: 53.780678°N 0.415950°W, Elmtree House (since 1949 Cottingham Memorial Club)) built 1820/1834, acquired by Cottingham Memorial Club in 1949.)

By 1837, the population of Cottingham was nearly 2,500, with over 500 houses. The interior and exteriors of the Church of Saint Mary were restored and renovated in 1845 and 1892 respectively. Monuments to Thomas Thompson (died 1828), and Thomas Perronet Thompson were added in the 19th century. The current (2012) Arlington Hall and Mark Kirby school buildings adjacent to the church were built in the mid 19th century.

The rail network reached Cottingham in October 1846, with the opening of Cottingham railway station and the Hull and Bridlington Railway extension of the Hull and Selby Railway. Cottingham station was built close to and east of the village centre. (Note: 53.7817°N 0.406376°W, Cottingham railway station) After the arrival of the railway housing development began for the middle classes of Hull; resulting in the construction of terraced and semi-detached villas.

=== 1850 to present ===
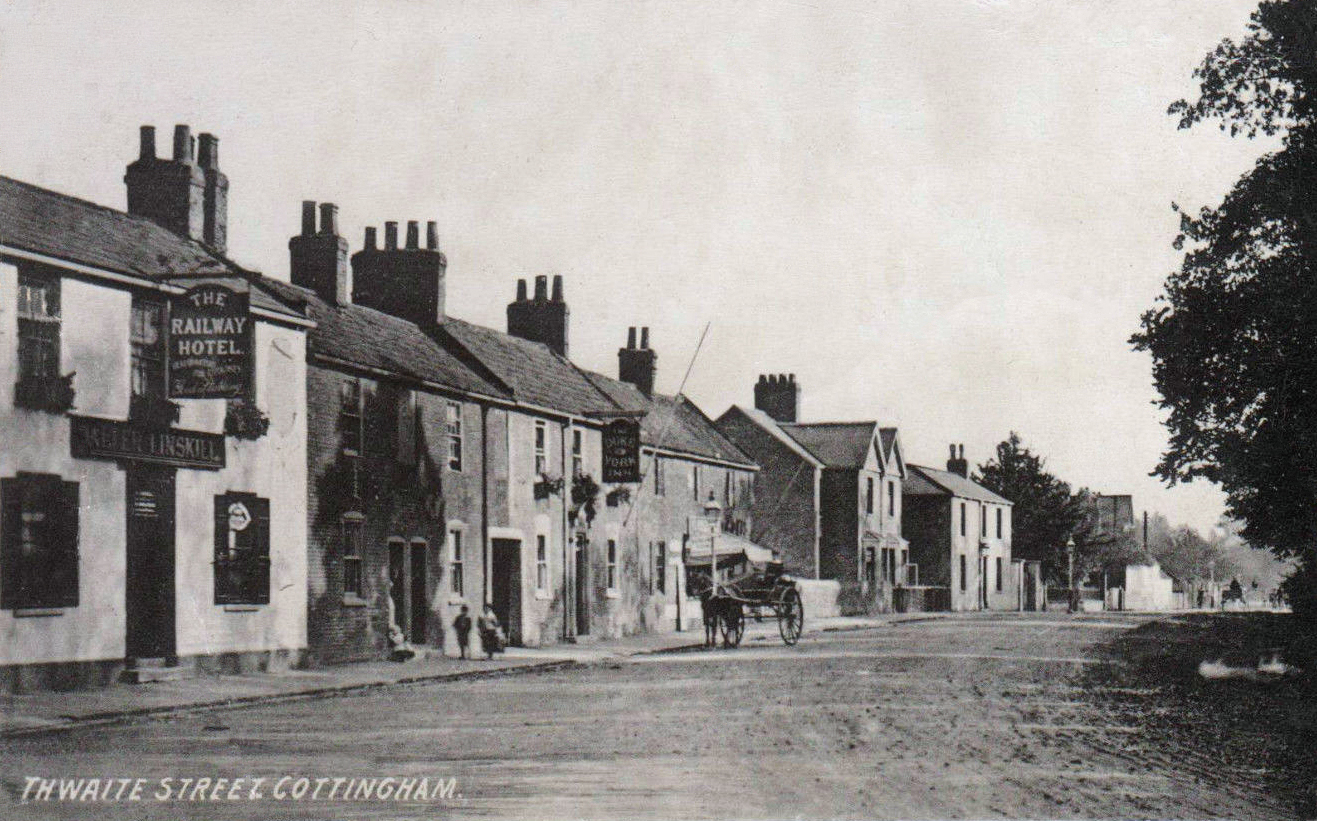
Thwaite Street, c. 1900

By the 1850s Cottingham was a substantial village, with housing along its main streets of Northgate, Hallgate, King Street, Newgate Street, South Street, and Thwaite Street. The Provincial Gaslight and Coke Company was established in the 1850s, building a gasworks in the village, north of the railway station, at a cost of £3,258. (Note: 53.78397°N 0.407205°W, Gas Works, site later used for a cloth mill, "Station Mills") The Cottingham gas undertaking was purchased by Hull Corporation in 1901, who switched to supply from their larger gasworks. During the 20th century the gas works site was used for a cloth mill, "Station Mills", owned by Paley & Donkin who produced oil press cloths. (Note: Paley & Donkin original established at Snuff Mill House in 1892 before moving to Station Mills. The oil press cloth business ended in the 1950s; the company diversified into worsted yarn and carpet manufacture. Manufacturing ended 1979.) Additional industry developed on the site north-west of the station, including a saw mill. As of 2012 the mill buildings are still extant, and in industrial/commercial use.

Until 1857, nearby Skidby was part of the parish of Cottingham.

In 1875, Charles Wilson acquired Thwaite House and extended it, converting it into a substantial mansion. General housing development between the 1850s and 1890 was limited, a terrace of houses was built on the eastern part of Hallgate, close to the railway station. By 1910, additional terraces had been built to the north and east of the village close to the railway, on New Village Lane and east of Millhouse Woods Lane.

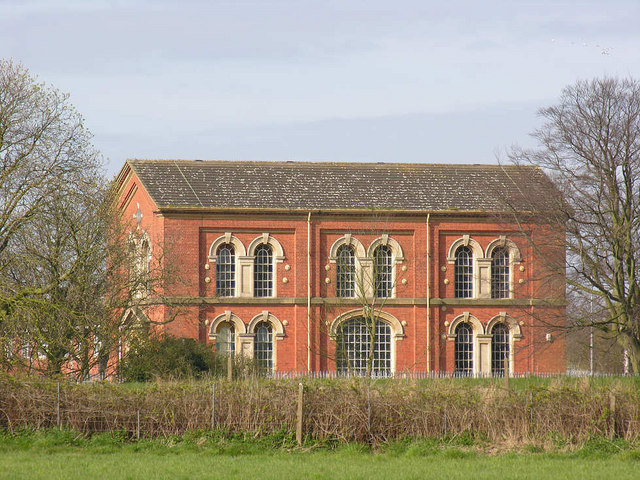
'Mill Dam' pumping house, late 1800s (2007)

By the 1870s the expansion of Hull was predicted to be such that additional water supply would be needed, and plans for extraction were made for two sites near Cottingham. In 1890 a pumping station ('Mill Dam pumping station') was opened north of the village centre, near Mill Dam stream; built to supply Kingston upon Hull with water from the aquifer via three boreholes. (Note: The Kingston-upon-Hull Corporation and Water Act 1884 (47 & 48 Vict. c. lx) allowed water extraction at Mill Dam stream near Cottingham. Three boreholes were sunk, operated by three compound pumping engines. Triple expansion engines supplied by Worthington-Simpson, Ltd were installed in 1932-4. The pumping station was connected to the rail network by a short spur off the Hull to Bridlington railway line until the second half of the 20th century. By 1999 the works had two pumping shafts in operation, with about 0.6 miles (1 km) of adits, and was licensed to extract over 68,000 cubic metres per day. See also: adit image: in Gale et al. 2006, "Plate 3 Converging adits in the Cottingham shaft and adit source", p. 49) (Note: 53.794048°N 0.411775°W, Cottingham water pumping station, also known as Mill Dam pumping station) West of the village at Keldgate a reservoir was constructed in 1909 with a capacity of about 10,000,000 imp gal (45,000 m^{3}); representing a day's usage. The reservoir was expanded in the 1930s, with the construction of a second "No.2 reservoir" with a capacity of about 8,000,000 imp gal (36,000 m^{3}). (Note: 53.786747°N 0.445504°W, Keldgate water works, covered reservoirs adjacent east.)

In around 1890, a cemetery separate to the churchyard was established, on Eppleworth Road; (Note: 53.78337°N 0.43023°W, Eppleworth Road cemetery) the earliest recorded interment dates to 1889. In 1913–6 the development of Castle Hill Hospital began, on the site of the former Cottingham Castle house. the initial buildings were a tuberculosis sanitorium, the hospital was extended westwards between 1921 and 1939 with the addition of an infectious diseases hospital.

The large houses Northfields House, and Thwaite House, were acquired by the nascent Hull University in 1928, converted to halls of residence, and renamed Needler Hall and Thwaite Hall respectively. Both Halls were substantially extended in the period after acquisition for university accommodation use. In 1951 the university created another hall of residence, 'Cleminson Hall' on grounds south of Thwaite Hall, the site was expanded for student accommodation in the 1960s. (Note: The original house, known as 'The Bungalow', (Note: 53.778289°N 0.401783°W, "The Bungalow", later part of Cleminson Hall, now part of 'Cleminson Halls' housing estate) was built by shipowner Charles Wilson, 1st Baron Nunburnholme, around the beginning of the 20th century for his son Charles Wilson, 2nd Baron Nunburnholme.) Cleminson Hall was closed in 2003/4, and the site sold, the site was redeveloped into a housing estate between 2009 and 2012.

During the Second World War, a temporary camp (Harland Way Camp) was constructed near Cottingham Grange. Initially, it housed refugees, and it later became an army transit camp; the grange itself was used as officers quarters. The house was demolished by the 1950s and the site split between the new Cottingham Secondary school and Hull University. Hull University built the neo-Georgian block of Ferens Hall in 1956/7 on the army camp site, and in 1963 construction of a large modernist pale-brown brick halls of residence, designed by Gillespie, Kidd & Coia known as The Lawns began on the east side of the same site. (Note: 53.787852°N 0.426042°W, The Lawns (Hull University accommodation)) Cottingham Secondary School (as of 2012 Cottingham High School) opened in 1955, with extension opened in the 1975/8, on the western side of the former Cottingham Grange site.

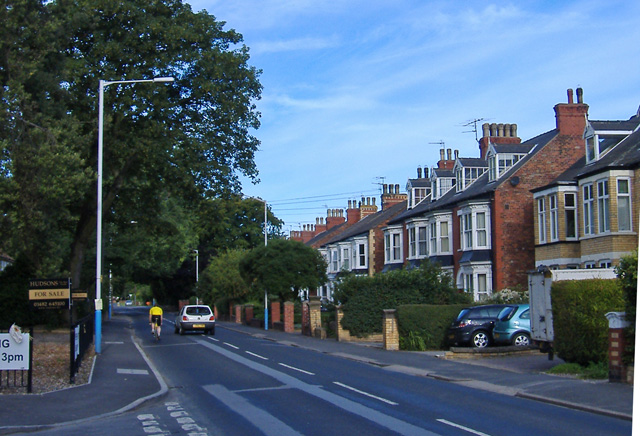
Early 20th century terraces, South Street (2007)

The village became increasingly urbanised in the first half of the 20th century, particularly by terraced housing. Additionally the road to Hull was developed, with housing near continuous along it by the 1950s. During the interwar period the boundaries of Hull were expanded, taking in part of Cottingham; the North Hull Estate was constructed on the north-west fringe of the city in the 1930s, and by mid-century, only a narrow strip of green space separated Hull from Cottingham on its eastern boundary near 'New Village'.

In the post-Second World War period, extensive urban development and expansion took place, in particular to the south of the village. In this period most of the development was of detached and semi-detached dwellings, often with front and rear gardens. By the mid-1950s Southwood Hall was surrounded by houses. Expansion continued in the later part of the 20th century: there was further housing built to the north of Northgate, as well as a large amount of housing expansion westwards towards Castle Hill Hospital. The development reached an effective maximum extent by the 1970s: in the decades following (up to 2010), a limited amount of extra housing stock was built, mostly infill developments within the urban limit of the 1970s.

The caravan manufacturing company Swift (see Swift Leisure) moved from Hull to a factory north-east of Cottingham in 1970, the company expanded its facilities in the early 2000s, investing £6.8 million in a new factory. (Note: 53.79783°N 0.40223°W, Swift caravan factory, post 2006 development location) A new connection to the A1079 road 'Beverley Bypass' was built for the upgraded factory development. In 2015 Swift began a 116,250 square feet (10,800 m^{2}) expansion of their factory, with a further 72,656 square feet (6,750.0 m^{2}) of covered storage.

In 1981, the tradition of installing Christmas lights was started by local traders, as a way of increasing trade and adding to the sense of community during the winter season.

Castle Hill Hospital was extended by the addition of an oncology and hematology unit in 2009, The Queen's Centre for Oncology and Haematology, a cardiac unit and additional cancer centre for teenage patients in 2011.

In 1999, the reservoirs at Keldgate were added to with the installation of a water treatment works adjacent to the west; the plant had a capacity of 90 ML/d and was supplied with water from the main four local extraction boreholes (Springhead, Keldgate, Cottingham, Dunswell). Treatment facilities included ultrafiltration, modification of plumbosolvency, disinfection and chlorination. The works were designed with an architectural style intended to mimic a local brick and pantile built building. Due to rising levels of nitrate contamination of the groundwater an ion-exchange nitrate removal plant was added in 2009 with a capacity of 33 ML/d; the plant used a rotating schedule of 20 de-nitrating reactors (14 online, 6 in stages of regeneration) with the ion exchange media regeneration phased including an initial backwash fluidisation stage, followed by countercurrent ion-exchange resin recharge.

In the late 2000s, a large 20-acre (8 ha), 13,000 interment capacity cemetery named Priory Woods Cemetery was built on Priory Road, on the southern fringes of the village for the use of Hull City Council. (Note: 53.7744°N 0.4082°W, Priory Woods cemetery) The cemetery was opposed by East Riding of Yorkshire Council, and by some local residents but was allowed on an appeal, and formally opened in May 2010.

In 2014, planning permission was granted for up to 125 houses to the west of the village, south of Castle Road, at a site formerly used by Twinacre Nurseries; the first houses were completed by late 2015. An adjacent site was also sought to be developed in the same period – an initial plan for up to 600 houses as part of a mixed use development (2013) was submitted by Hull and East Yorkshire NHS Trust but rejected; an amended and reduced plan for up to 180 dwellings between Willerby Low Road and Castle Road was submitted in 2014 and accepted.

In 2016, planning permission was granted for a 320 home development on a 26 acres (11 ha) site to the north-west of the village, south of Harland Way.

== Geography ==
The approximate boundaries of the modern civil parish of Cottingham are the A164 Beverley to Humber Bridge road to the west and Kingston upon Hull to the east. The southern boundary is in fields between the village and Willerby and Hull. The southern half of the parish consists mostly of the town of Cottingham, as well as Castle Hill Hospital. The northern half of the parish is primarily agricultural, including glasshouse horticulture and a Traveller site on Wood Hill Way. The only significant non-agricultural industry is the caravan manufacturing site in the north-east of the parish (as of 2012 "Swift Caravans"), with over 607,000 sq ft (56,400 m^{2}) of buildings on a 87-acre (35 ha) site.

Cottingham is within the Parliamentary constituency of Kingston upon Hull North and Cottingham, which is represented by Dame Diana Johnson of the Labour Party.

A golf course and leisure club on Wood Hill Way, and a major (400/275 kV AC) electricity substation "Creyke Beck", (Note: 53.800828°N 0.415159°W, Creyke Beck electricity substation) lie just outside the formal boundaries of the parish, within Skidby civil parish. The substation is the connection point for the GigaWatt-sized Dogger Bank Wind Farm, and two grid batteries at a combined 145 MW power.

Historically, Cottingham was noted for its springs: ones to the north of the town formed a north to south riverlet through the town, that drove Snuff Mill; whilst a large and vigorous gypsey existed at Keldgate. Unsustainable levels of water extraction in the area since the 1930s are thought to have reduced water table levels and to have caused the disappearance of springs in the area. There is water supply infrastructure at Keldgate (reservoir, potable water treatment (Note: The water treatment works lies outside the (2006) formal boundary of the parish, within the civil parish of Skidby, the rest of the water infrastructure at Keldgate is within the civil parish of Cottingham)), and a potable water pumping stations: at Cottingham Pumping Station (68.2 ML/d extraction limit 2004); and at Keldgate Spring (15.9 Ml d^{−1} extraction limit 2004 (Note: 53.783416°N 0.4430664°W, Keldgate borehole, Keldgate springs are about 110 yards (100 m) east)). As of 2004 the extraction from the Cottingham and Keldgate bores, together with extraction at the nearby Springhead Pumping Station and at Dunswell (45.5 Ml d^{−1} each) supplies nearly half of Kingston upon Hull's water supply.

In 1991, the population of Cottingham was recorded at 16,528. This had risen to 17,623 at the time of the 2001 UK census. According to the 2011 UK census, the population of the parish dropped to 17,164. Apart from the two Traveller's sites (Woodhill Way and Eppleworth Road) and a small number of farms, there are no habitation centres in the parish outside the main village.

The eastern part of the parish is less than 16-foot (5 m) above sea level, it rises steadily to over 135-foot (41 m) above sea level on the western edge of the parish, which is at the edge of the Yorkshire Wolds hills.

=== Present day ===
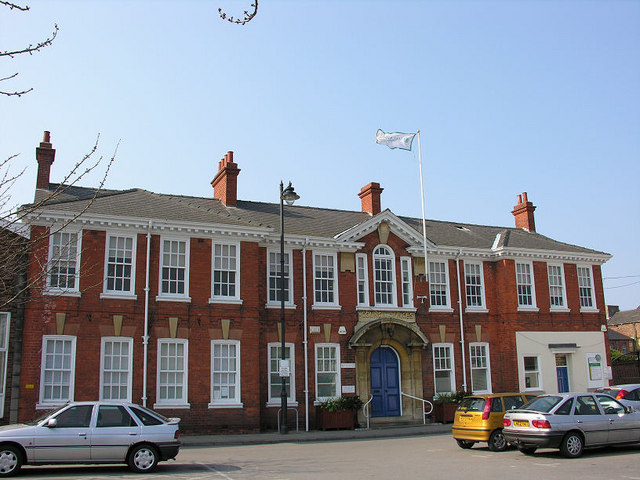
Council offices on Market Green (2007)

The modern village has two main shopping streets, Hallgate and King Street which cross each other: Hallgate runs east to west from the medieval church to the triangular West Green, near the location of the former Baynard Castle; King Street runs north to south from Northgate to Newgate Street, Market Green (now a car park) is on the southern half of King Street, on the west side, and is the location of the council offices, library and civic hall. A market is held on Market Green on Thursday. The area including Hallgate and King Street, plus areas around and east of the railway station including Hull Road are part of a conservation area as defined by the Planning (Listed Buildings and Conservation Areas) Act 1990.

Cottingham was used by the University of Hull as the site of several of its accommodation campuses: The Lawns to the north-west of the village; and Thwaite Hall, and Needler's Hall, both built on the grounds of late 18th century merchant's houses, and extending the original residences. (Note: See entries in history section for details) There are several other large halls and houses of distinction within and on the periphery of the village, mostly dating from the late 18th and early 19th century, including Southwood Hall (17th century), Newgate House, Eastgate House, Westfield House, The Green Wickets, Springfield House, Beech House, Elmtree House, 'The Bungalow', and Snuff Mill House. Within the historic village boundary there are some humbler buildings dating from the 18th century and earlier, which are now listed, (Note: In particular the 18th century buildings: numbers 24, 26, and 28 Beck Bank; 188, King Street; Sarum House, Northgate; White House, Hallgate; and 100 and 102 Thwaite Street are listed buildings, as are the late 17/ early 18th century single storey cottages at 7, 8, and 9 Market Green. See search results for "East Riding of Yorkshire, Cottingham (Unitary Authority=East Riding of Yorkshire)" at list.historicengland.org.uk) The remainder of Cottingham's housing includes post-railway Victorian terraces, as well as a large amount of interwar period and post Second World War housing.

There are several public houses in Cottingham; including The Blue Bell and The Fair Maid (formerly Westfield House) on West Green, The Duke of Cumberland on Market Green, The Cross Keys Inn on Northgate , The King William IV (locally known as 'The King Billy') and Hallgate Tavern on Hallgate, and The Tiger on King Street. In 2018 a new micro pub, The Hugh Fitz-Baldric, opened on Hallgate.

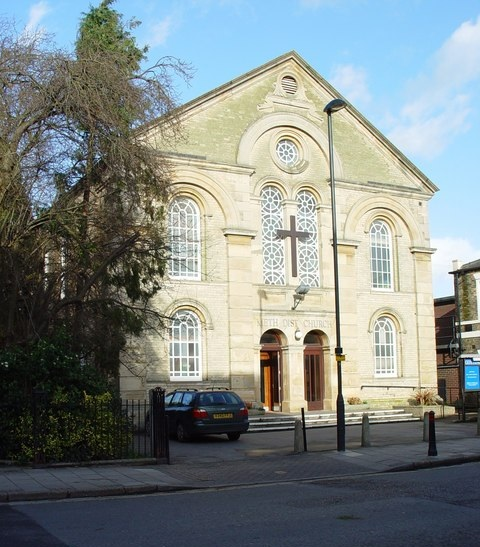
The Methodist chapel, built 1878 (2008)

Cottingham has churches serving Church of England, Methodist, Roman Catholic, and United Reformed Church Christian denominations, as well as having a Community Church. There is a Kingdom Hall of the Jehovah's Witnesses. Cottingham Churches Together organises joint acts of worship and charity events throughout the year.

Cottingham has two cemeteries; one is located on the southern fringe of the village and is used by Hull City Council; the other is located on Eppleworth Road, and contains the grave of poet Philip Larkin, and a Commonwealth War Graves Commission memorial to casualties of the First and Second World Wars.

Cottingham Springboard Festival takes place over three days each May, with live music in public houses from mainly local and regional acts.

== Education ==
There are four primary schools: Bacon Garth; Croxby; Hallgate and Westfield, and one secondary school, Cottingham High School.

Croxby Primary School (53.771118°N 0.39340°W) is a primary school serving Cottingham and the Bricknell Avenue area. Its intake is made up of children from two Education Authorities. The school was seriously affected by the floods which hit the East Riding of Yorkshire during June 2007. The school itself flooded, which resulted in it being closed 4 weeks early. The pupils were educated in classrooms at the University of Hull for the remainder of the school year. Although the school site re-opened for the start of the September 2007 new school year, the majority of children were educated in mobile classrooms.

== Transport ==
The village lies just east of the A164 which links Cottingham to Beverley, the Humber Bridge, the A1079 and the M62 via the A63. The B1233 road runs from Skidby Roundabout on the A164 north-west of Cottingham, through the village to Hull city centre via the A1079 which it meets in the Newland area of Hull. Castle Road also meets the A164 at Castle Hill Roundabout at the south-west end of the village.

Cottingham is also served by Cottingham railway station just east of the village centre on the Yorkshire Coast Line to Scarborough. Services include trains to Hull Paragon Interchange, York, Sheffield, Doncaster, Bridlington and Scarborough provided by Arriva Rail North. There is also a direct train to London Kings Cross provided by Hull Trains.

There are regular bus services to Hull, Hessle, Beverley and Hornsea with an occasional direct bus to York which are provided by East Yorkshire.

== Sport and outdoor activities ==
Cottingham was the birthplace of the 1940s and 1950s female boxing champion Barbara Buttrick, the first female boxer to have her fight broadcast on national television.

The village has a Scout group consisting of two Beavers groups, two Cubs packs, one Scout troop and one Explorer unit. There are also three Guide Units (one based in nearby Skidby), two Rainbow Units, three Brownie Packs and one Ranger (Senior Section) Unit based in the village. Further groups belong to the Cottingham Guiding District in Skidby (Rainbows), and Little Weighton (Brownies).

To the north of the village is King George V playing fields.

Hull City A.F.C.'s training ground is located on Millhouse Woods Lane on facilities previously owned by Northern Foods. The local football club, Cottingham Rangers AFC, was established in 1972 and consists of seventeen teams playing in the Hull & District Youth Football League and the East Riding Girls Football League. The club is affiliated to the East Riding County Football Association and is an FA Charter Standard Club.

== See also ==
- Listed buildings in Cottingham, East Riding of Yorkshire
