= Newland, Kingston upon Hull =

Area of Kingston upon Hull, East Riding of Yorkshire, England

Newland
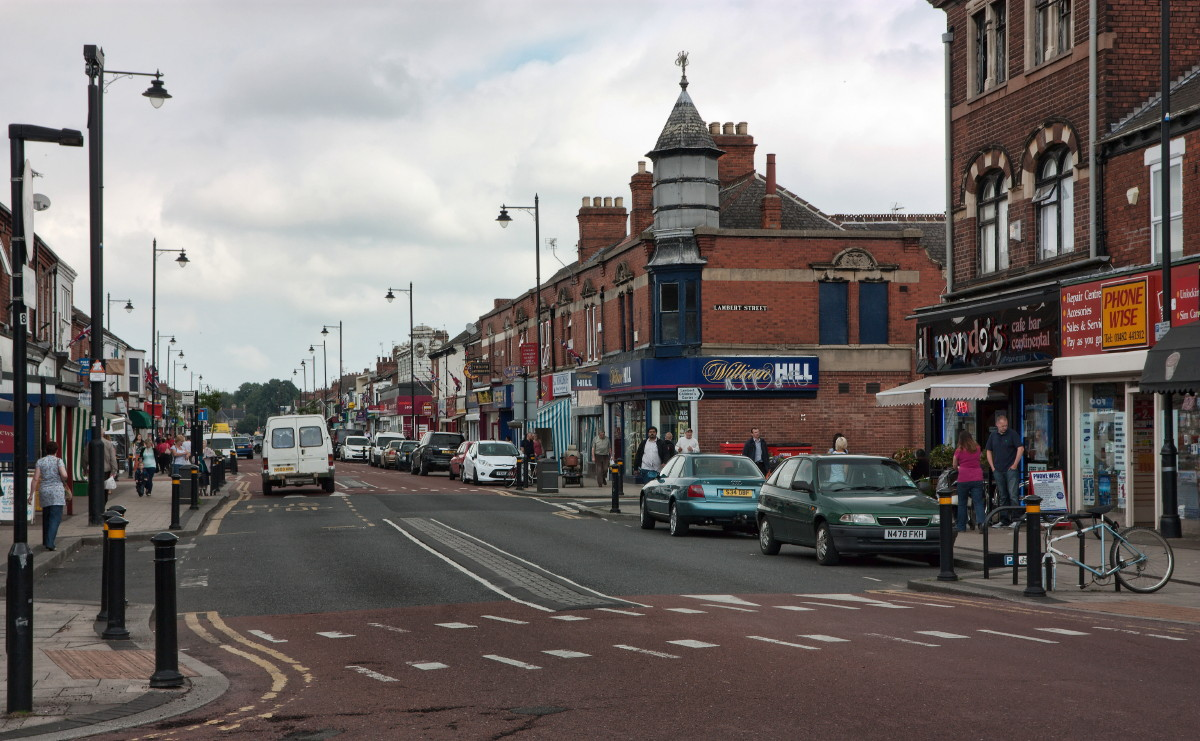
- Newland Avenue

- Location within the East Riding of Yorkshire
- Unitary authority: Kingston upon Hull
- Shire county: East Riding of Yorkshire
- Region: Yorkshire and the Humber
- Country: England
- Sovereign state: United Kingdom

Newland is a suburb of Kingston upon Hull, East Riding of Yorkshire, England, in the north-west of the city, a former village on the Hull to Beverley turnpike.

Before the mid-18th century Newland was a hamlet in a partially swampy agricultural area, located near the crossroads of Cottingham and Beverley-Hull turnpikes. Extensive enclosure and drainage took place after 1766, and it briefly developed as a preferred place for Hull merchants in the 19th century. The future parish church, St John's, was built in 1833, and in 1862 the ecclesiastical parish of Newland was established as separate from Cottingham in the East Riding. By the beginning of the 20th century the urban spread of Hull had reached Newland, and over the next half century the village was surrounded by housing and other developments.

The modern area of Newland includes and the former site of the Kingston upon Hull Municipal Training College (est. 1913), later the University of Humberside and now part of the neighbouring Hull University (est. 1925), as well as the Newland Park Estate, Newland Allotments and the Newland Avenue areas.

Other notable structures in the area include the former Endsleigh convent (orig. built 1876, expanded), and former Sailor's Orphan's Homes (1890s), and the modern Humberside Police headquarters (2012). The Newland area extends along Clough Road to the River Hull – east of the Cottingham Road–Beverley Road crossroads, where the area is in primarily industrial and commercial use. On the banks of the Hull is a chemical works of the Croda company.

== Geography ==
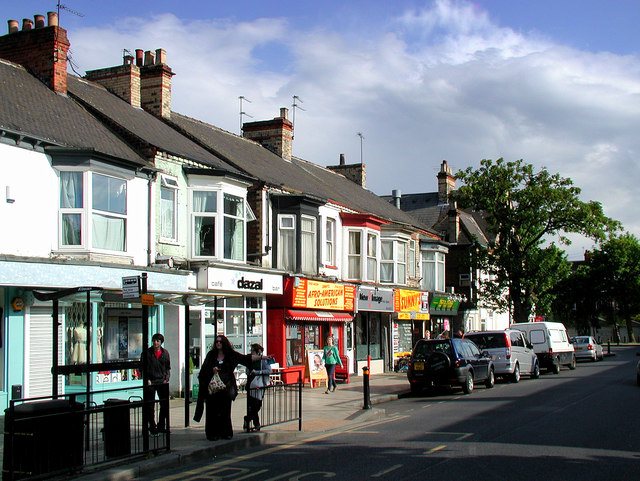
Shops on Newland Avenue (2009)

The modern area of Newland is roughly equivalent to that set out as a parish in 1862 – it is centred on Cottingham Road, between its junctions with Beverley Road (A1079) and with Newland Avenue. (Note: 53.768438°N 0.353774°W, Crossroads of Beverley and Cottingham roads) Near the Beverley Road crossroads is the original parish church, St John's; and to the west are some houses dating from the 19th century village. West along Cottingham Road are the Newland Park Estate on the south side, and Hull University, including the buildings of the former Humberside University, on the north. Newland Avenue runs south of Cottingham Road west and approximately parallel to Beverley Road; (Note: 53.764915°N 0.358828°W, Newland Avenue (approximate centre)) from the crossroads eastward is Clough Road, now an industrial area.

To the west is further housing within Hull, centred around Bricknell Avenue; at the western edge to the North and Northwest is the North Hull Estate, and beyond that Cottingham and the Orchard Park Estate; to the south-west and south-east are the urban areas of The Avenues, Pearson Park, and Stepney. The Clough Road area is bounded to the east by the River Hull on the far bank of which is Stoneferry; to the south of the Clough Road area is the industrial area known as Sculcoates.

Newland Avenue is an important local shopping area, with 170 shops (2015).

The area (excluding Clough Road) is predominately a mixture of housing and educational buildings, with significant open spaces including playing fields, allotments, and the Northern Cemetery. In addition to the north–south and east–west main roads the Beverley and Barmston Drain also passes through the region, forming an approximate boundary between the housing use of the west and the industrial use along Clough Road. The NW-SW route of the now covered Cottingham Drain is still visible from the mapped or aerial geography, and forms a boundary between the University (excluding former Humberside polytechnic buildings) and The Quadrant area of the North Hull Estate. Newlands is low lying, under 5 metres (16 ft) below sea level, and flat.

== History ==
=== Early history to 1860 ===
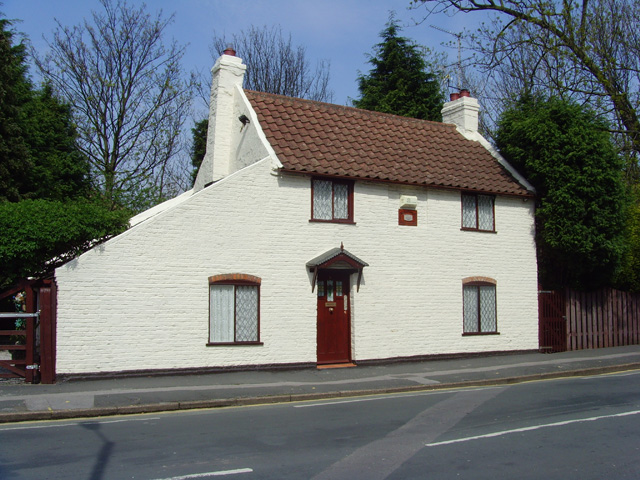
Bridge End Cottage, 1785 (2008)

The Beverley-Hull road, which passed through Newland was turnpiked by an act of Parliament of 1744, the Kingston-upon-Hull and Beverley Road Act 1743 (17 Geo. 2. c. 25), with a toll bar established at Newland, at a place called Newland Bridge. (Note: On 12 September 1540 King Henry VIII visited Hull, first meeting the Sheriff at a place called "Bordenbrig" (or Boarden'd Bridge, Boarded-Bridge), at Newland. Once in Hull the King ordered the construction of Hull Castle, other works, and the cutting of a dyke from Newland to Hull.) In 1764 the act was extended in duration, with the road from Newland Bridge to Cottingham added to the trustees' responsibilities.

In around 1797 the area of Newlands (Newlands Tofts and Newland Fields) was described in The Gentleman's Magazine as "low and flat, but exceedingly rich pasture ground, producing plenty of milk and butter, which affords the best supply for Hull market"; in the same Newland was described as a "Neat little hamlet". Etherington House, a former farmhouse turned small manor house, is a private residence north of Newland and dates to the mid-18th century when built by wealthy local landowners and philanthropic Etherington family in the early part of the 18th century. The house itself is a traditional Georgian country house, front of the house notably had two complementary Georgian panelled flat windows however in refurbishments during the Edwardian era they had been replaced with bay panelled windows which line both the drawing room and library. The two rooms are connected by the main hallway which has the decorations of ornate dark oak wooden panelling and elaborate coffered ceiling. The house, standing in its own "well timbered and secluded gardens of about 1 acre of land" are well protected with high brick walls established trees and shrubs which include a tennis, croquet and bowls lawn. The gardens surrounding the house also include herbaceous borders and rose beds, small garden kitchens a traditional Victorian era greenhouse and vinary and two concrete air raid shelters. The house, which is listed under section 32 of the Town and Country Planning Act 1932 as of Historic or Architectural interest and is probably unique within the Hull City boundary.

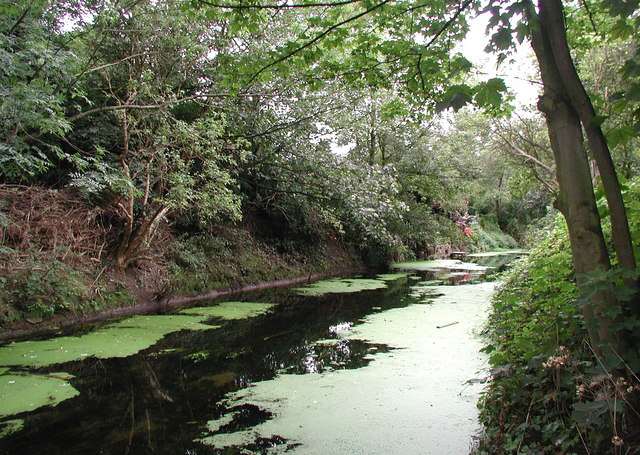
Beverley and Barmston Drain near crossing of Beverley Road (2008)

An act of Parliament for the enclosure and drainage of Cottingham, the Cottingham Inclosure Act 1766 (6 Geo. 3. c. 78 Pr.) was passed; the Beverley and Skidby Drain was enabled by the Beverley and Skidby Drainage Act 1785 (25 Geo. 3. c. 92); and the Beverley and Barmston Drain was built after the Beverley and Barmston Drainage Act 1798 (38 Geo. 3. c. lxiii). The Cottingham Drain improved the marshy land in the area. (Note: The marshy nature of the land in the Newland area is indicated by the names of the areas the Cottingham Drain passed through : Salt Ings, Igglemire, (Note: On old Ordnance Survey maps spelled Igglemire now rendered as Inglemire.) Harpings. (see also Ings)) The Barmston, and the Skidby Drains were built primarily for areas beyond Newland. The Barmston Drain crossed Beverley Road east of the village running very approximately parallel with, and around 0.5 miles (1 km) west of, the River Hull. At the point the drain passes under the Beverley Road "Bridge End Cottage" (1785) is still extant. (Note: 53.772031°N 0.355877°W, Bridge End Cottage (1785)) The Skidby Drain ran roughly parallel to the Barnston Drain under 0.25 miles (0.4 km) east. Three houses on the south side of Cottingham Road are remnants of the village, dating to the late 1700s.

Hull merchants migrated to Newland in the early 19th century, building large houses. In 1832 a church was consecrated at Newland. (Note: 53.768895°N 0.352607°W, St Johns church) The church, St John's (built 1833) is in the perpendicular style in yellow brick with ashlar dressings and a slate roof. The chancel, and west bay of the nave was added 1893; and the north aisle in 1902. The vicarage, to the east, dates to 1862, and is also in yellow brick and ashlar with a slate roof. Newland National school on Clough Road near the church was established 1865.

At the far extreme of the surrounding land, on the west bank of the River Hull, opposite Stoneferry, a water works was established in 1845, taking water from the river – the river water may have been responsible for a cholera outbreak in 1849, and after 1860 the works was supplied from the Springhead Pumping Station (see also Stoneferry §History).

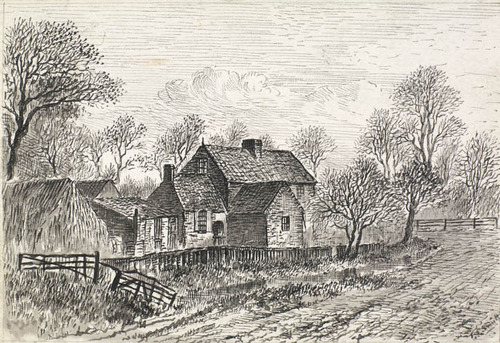
Newland Tofts Road (F. S. Smith, c. 1885)

In the mid-1850s the Newland area was almost completely rural and isolated from both Cottingham and Hull by enclosed fields. At Newland village the main roads met at a crossroads; the westward Cottingham branch of the Hull and Beverley Turnpike Trust (later Cottingham Road); the eastward Clough Road towards Stoneferry; and the north–south main road to Beverley from Hull of the Hull and Beverley Turnpike trust. Routes of some of the later important roads had also been established including the east-west Igglemire, and Endike lanes, north of the Cottingham Road; whilst the southward heading Near Salt Ings Lane, Far Salt Ings Lane and Tofts Lanes, which ran off the Cottingham Road correspond to the modern Kenilworth, Chanterlands North, and Newland Avenues. The land was drained, with the Beverley and Barmston Drain and Beverley and Skidby Drain passing east of the village, and the Cottingham Drain to the east. Newland village consisted of a number of large or largish dwellings with gardens, mainly along the south side of Cottingham Road, including Newland House, Newland Villa, and Newland Grove. (Note: (Sheahan 1864) mentions a Newland Park, a large brick house, and the residence of one time Mayor of Hull, Avison Terry – this may be Newland Grove, built before 1778, also one time residence of Avison Terry. Newland Villa was built c. 1780, and Newland House dated to at least 1827.) At the crossroads was the church, and an inn, the Haworth Arms. To the north-east of the village, Green Lane (now Oak Road) ran from the Beverley turnpike to Clough Road, with the Skidby Drain adjacent west. Close to the Stoneferry waterworks was a large brick and tile works. Some clay extraction took place in Newland – with a pit to the north of the village, and a substantial brick and tile works nearer the River Hull. (Note: Brick and tile works in the area have been recorded to as early as 1535.)

Religious nonconformists were active in the Newland area from the earliest period of that movement's history. Joseph Wilson was licensed to preach in Newland and Hull in 1672, and meetings were held at John Marr's house in Newland, and, later (1709) Margaret Dent's house. A Wesleyan chapel, designed by William Botterill in a gothic style was opened on Cottingham Road in Newland in 1858 (enlarged 1867, 1873, later used by the Port of Hull Society, dem. 1896).

=== 1860–1913 ===
In 1862 the parish of Newland was established, separated from Cottingham, with the parish church being St John's. (Note: The region split from the parish of Cottingham was formed by a line following (from the south) – the route of the Hull and Bridlington branch railway to the east to its crossing of the Setting Dike, then eastwards by the dike, then north along "Near Salt-Ings Lane" (now roughly Kenilworth or Fairfax Avenue), then east along the Cottingham section of the Hull and Beverley trust road (now Cottingham Road), then east to the point the road crossed the Cottingham Drain, then along the drain north-west crossing Igglemire, and Endike lanes, then north along Nine Foot Drain, crossing North Carr Lane, and north to Moor Dike Drain, then north along Panbottom Drain, then north crossing Dunswell Lane.) By this time Newland was considered a suburb of Hull. In 1871 the road through Newlands became un-tolled.

The Queen's Hotel (Queens Road) was built c. 1865. (Note: 53.760163°N 0.356706°W, Queen's Hotel) The St John's Hotel, further east also dates to 1865. (Note: 53.761384°N 0.352211°W, St John's Hotel)

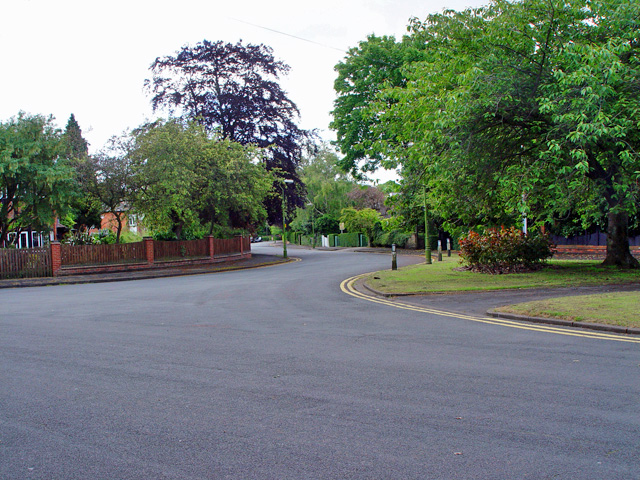
Road junction in Newland Park Estate (2008)

The Newland Park Estate was established c. 1877 by William Botterill on the south side of Cottingham Road. (Note: 53.767821°N 0.370571°W, Newland Park) It developed slowly as a high status middle class housing estate over the next half century. Several of the houses are in an Arts and Crafts style, with a variety of architectural styles found.

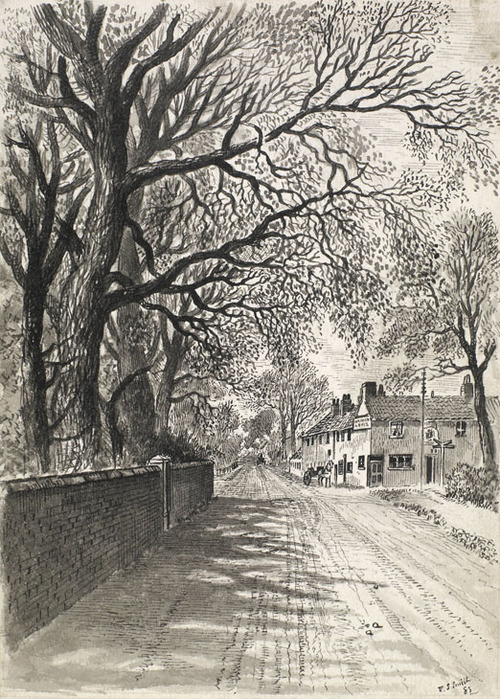
The Haworth Arms from Clough Road (F. S. Smith, 1883)

In 1885 the Hull and Barnsley Railway opened – its branch to the Alexandra Dock (now Hull Docks Branch) passed through the south of the parish, crossing Newland Avenue by a bridge. (Note: 53.761392°N 0.358999°W, Hull and Barnsley Railway bridge, Newland Avenue)

Newland village had not grown substantially by the 1890s, but the urban spread of Hull had reached its southern side, the main development being an estate on the east side of Newland Avenue, between the Beverley Road, an area known as St John's Wood. Queens Road had been laid out, along part of the route of the Cottingham Drain, connecting the south end of Newland Avenue to Beverley Road. On the west side of Newland Avenue the only development was Sharp Street. A Wesleyan mission had been built (1886) on Willow Grove off Princes Street. Additionally another brick and tile works had been established between Igglemire Lane, and the Beverley and Barmston Drain, as well as one west of Newland Avenue, south of Sharp Street. The brick and tile works on the banks of the river was now known as Kingston Sanitary Pipe Works whilst an associated works nearby off Green Lane was a bottle works. (Note: In Bulmers 1892 edition a Young John Robert was listed as a stone bottle and garden pot manufacturer, at the Bottle works, Newland.) (Note: The Green Lane works was later known as Newland Glass Bottle Works and the Kingston Pottery, whilst the river side works had become a paint works "Newland Paint Works" by 1910.) Adjacent to the sanitary pipe works was a mill, "Hull Bank Mills". (Note: 'Hull Bank Mills', later (1920s) 'Universal Oil Mills', (Universal Oil Company, subsid. of United Premier Oil & Cake Company) after 1966 acquired by Croda.) (Note: 53.770957°N 0.341642°W, Hull Bank Mills / Universal Oil Mills / Croda)

At the far south end of the Newland Avenue area a number of civic buildings were put up around the end of the 19th century: the George Lamb Memorial Chapel was built 1893 on Lambert Street in a Classical Revival style for the Primitive Methodists; (Note: 53.763358°N 0.35684°W, Lambert Street chapel) the Anglican St Augustine of Hippo church (1896, dem.1976), and its associated church hall (1902), and vicarage (No.41 Queen's Road, 1899/1900). In the early 20th century the Catholic St Vincent Primary School (1904); (Note: 53.760877°N 0.354789°W, St Vincent's RC school) and St Vincent Boy's home (1908–09) were built nearby. In Newland the 1858 Wesleyan chapel was replaced (1901) by one the other side of the road. A church was added adjacent in 1928. (Note: 53.768433°N 0.358791°W, Cottingham Road chapel) On Lambert Street the Cottingham school board opened a school (1879) for girls and infants; after becoming part of the Hull school board (1883) it was expanded. It became a junior school in 1937; (Note: 53.763156°N 0.355746°W, Lambert Street school (site of)) Newland Avenue school (after 1945 Pearson High school) was opened by the Hull board in 1896 as primary school, expanded in 1900. (Note: 53.762014°N 0.359681°W, Newland School)

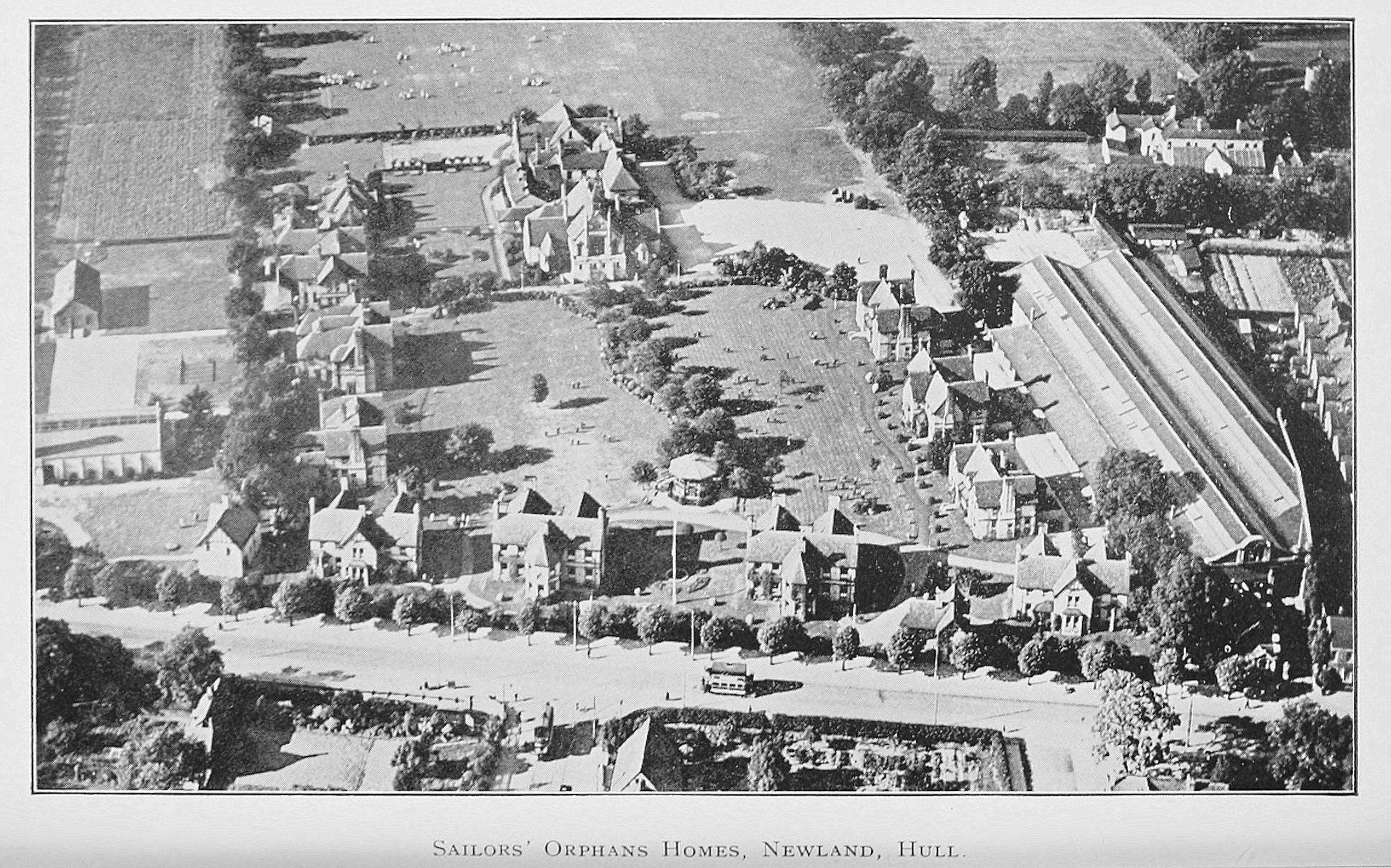
Sailor's Orphan Homes (c. 1922)

At the end of the 19th century (1895–1898), a large group of "Sailor's Orphan Cottage Homes", more recently known as "Newland Homes", were built in yellow brick on the north side of Cottingham Road by the Port of Hull Society, (Note: 53.770088°N 0.358739°W, Sailor's Orphan Homes (former)) with several local businessmen contributing funds for their construction, including Joseph Rank, Francis Reckitt, Sir James Reckitt, as well as benefactors from outside Hull including William Richardson, G Buckston Browne and Sir Titus Salt, and contributions from the towns of Whitby and Hartlepool. St Nicholas Primary School, Hull was also built at the site during the period. (Note: 53.769389°N 0.358345°W, St Nicholas primary school) A hospital, orphanage and surgery were added between 1919 and 1926.

The large Endsleigh (or Dawson) House (built 1876–77, near Beverley Road) became a convent of the Sisters of Mercy in 1901. (Note: 53.770582°N 0.355403°W, Endsleigh convent) The site was expanded (c. 1905) with the addition of a chapel and teacher training college. The non-conformists had a meeting place on Queen's Road: Bethshan Mission Room between 1899–1990; from 1903 to 1958 a Bethshan was registered on the nearby Prince's Road, (after 1958 Holiness Hall was registered on the same street).

By 1910 in addition to the orphanage, and partial development of the Newland Park Estate, there had been large amounts of urban development in the area, primarily around Newland Avenue. The area between Newland Avenue and Beverley Road was completely filled with housing, excluding a nursery Smiddy's Nursery; and there was development of housing all along west side of Newland Avenue; additionally housing had been built on the opposite side of Beverley Road (just outside the parish) as far as the Newland crossroads; and on the north-west side of the crossroads a small estate around Haworth Street had been built; north-east of the crossroads more substantial housing had been built on Beresford and Wellesley avenues. By this period the village was no longer distinct from the urban spread of Hull. Additionally a leather works had been established on Cottingham Road. (Note: The firm known as Waddingtons, established by George Waddington in the mid 19th century. The works closed in the latter part of the 20th century and the site redeveloped as housing, Waddington Court.)

In 1909 the Hull Corporation Trams had reached the Newland crossroads on Beverley Road, and a tram depot was established on Cottingham Road. (Note: 53.769471°N 0.356838°W, Cottingham Road tram depot. As of 2010 the site boundaries remain, including some walls (west side), the plot has been used for a housing development; the office buildings at the entrance to Cottingham Road (west side) still exist, and are used as offices.)

Hull's Northern Cemetery opened at around the end of the 19th century, a chapel was added in 1912. (Note: 53.766743°N 0.37821°W, Northern (Chanterlands) Cemetery)

=== 1914–1939 ===
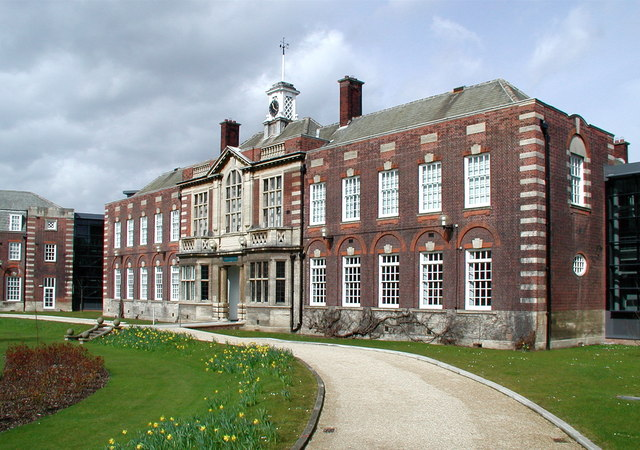
Former 'Kingston upon Hull Municipal Training College' of 1913, now part of Hull University (2008)

A college of education, Kingston upon Hull Municipal Training College, was opened in 1913 – on the north side of Cottingham Road. (Note: 53.770005°N 0.370416°W, former Humberside University) Buildings included a library, halls of residence, and offices were built (1909–13) in three blocks surrounding an oval of ground facing Cottingham Road, together with lodges on either side, with a gymnasium to the rear. The buildings were mostly in a Wrenaissance style. (Note: In 1976 the college became part of The Hull College of Higher Education, and later the University of Humberside and Lincolnshire, and in 2001 part of the University of Lincoln.) This included the Principal's House, now 246 Cottingham Road, which was inhabited by Cyril Bibby and family from 1959.

The main brick Neo-Georgian building of Newland High School for Girls was built 1914; it was used as a Voluntary Aid Detachment hospital during the First World War; the school itself opened in 1920 having been transferred to the new site from Brunswick Avenue. (Note: 53.77247°N 0.371545°W, Newland school for girls)

A Catholic boys school was established by the Marist Brothers in 1925 on Cottingham Road, (Note: 53.767994°N 0.361991°W, Marist College (site of)) (closed 1988) also a temporary church. In 1927 a Catholic primary school (initially Holy Child, later Endsleigh (Note: 53.771705°N 0.357342°W, Endsleigh school (former training college))) was established (1927, expanded 1963) associated with the Endsleigh training college.

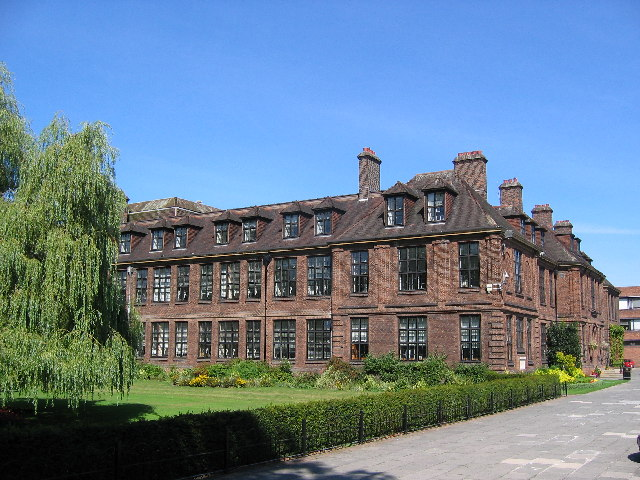
University of Hull Venn building, 1925 (2005)

In 1925 Hull University, then a university college was founded on a site donated by Thomas Ferens on the north side of Cottingham Road. (Note: 53.769898°N 0.367945°W, University of Hull) Initial building work was undertaken from 1927 to the design of William A. Forsyth, with the first students admitted in 1928. Initially only the Venn and Cohen main buildings were built, both were large buildings two storeys high plus attics in brick in a Neo-Georgian style on a squarish plan with a central enclosed square courtyard.

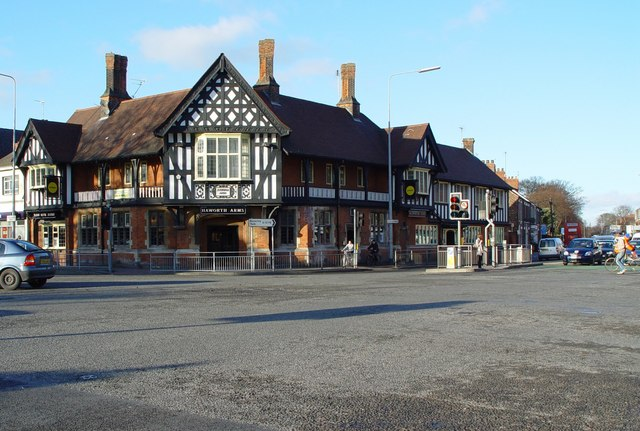
Haworth Arms Hotel, built c. 1925 (2008)

The (current) Haworth Arms at the Beverley Road/Cottingham Road junction was built in 1925 in a brick and timber framed style. An octagonal brick Methodist church was added at the Cottingham Road end of Newland Avenue in 1928, designed by Alfred Gelder. At the southern extremity of the Newland Avenue area a Roman Catholic church, dedicated to St Vincent de Paul was built in 1932 in a Romanesque style in brick. (Note: 53.760541°N 0.355577°W, St Vincent's RC church) A woman's hospital was built 1932/3 on Cottingham Road west of the University, just east of The Quadrant. (Note: 53.770984°N 0.377148°W, Woman's hospital)

By the mid-1920s the urban growth of Hull had extended north past Newland village – houses had been built along Beverley Road on the north-east side of the Barmston Drain, including a new estate around Etherington Road; additionally the housing off Newland had been expanded further – on the east Smiddy's Nursery had been replaced with a new street parallel to Newland Avenue, Hardy Street; and on the west another parallel street had been constructed, Exmouth Street, with court housing and a school and further west, with allotments beyond known today as Newland Allotments. Sidmouth Street Primary school, within the new housing west of Newland Avenue had been built 1910, and opened 1911 – it consisted of two large red brick blocks, each built in the style of a large early 18th-century building. (Note: 53.766634°N 0.362122°W, Sidmouth Street school)

Further west much of the Newland Park Estate had now been developed, a new estate established on the north side of the Cottingham Road around Cranbrook Avenue, and Chanterlands Avenue North laid out along the route of Far Salt Ings Lane, giving access to the new cemetery. A baptist chapel was built in 1927 on the corner of Chanterlands Avenue North and Cottingham Road. The tramways were extended to the end of Cottingham Road, as well as a line along Chanterlands Avenue connecting at Cottingham Road. The tram system was partially converted to a trolleybus system from 1936 onwards. Near the River Hull, east of the former brick, tile and pipe works a new factory, Pearson's Works had been built, producing disinfectant. (Note: Pearson's disinfectant works, moved to Hull in 1910 from Huddersfield. Pearsons was established by William Edward Pearson in 1880. Manufacturer of the Creolin black disinfectant derived from creosote. The works had closed and been demolished at the end of the 20th century.) (Note: 53.770196°N 0.336422°W, Pearson's disinfectant works (site of))

By the late 1930s the North Hull Estate was being built to the north of Endike Lane, and to the far west Bricknell, Fairfax and Kenilworth avenues had been laid out and were being developed for housing. A housing estate was expanding from Desmond Avenue between the earlier estates around Wellesley and Etherington avenues.

=== 1940–2000 ===
During the Second World War an anti-aircraft battery was on the Chanterlands Avenue side of the Northern Cemetery; there was also a military camp at the junction of Beverley Road and Endike Lane (later a TA barracks); other military installations included barrage balloons, anti-glider trenches and other associated military structures around the Oak Road playing field area in the north of Newland; as well as numerous structures built for more general use, specifically emergency water supply tanks, and numerous civilian air raid shelters. St Mary's Grammar school was transferred to huts near Endsleigh training college after its buildings at Anlaby Road were destroyed by bombing – a new building was built on Inglemire Lane in 1960. (Note: 53.774522°N 0.362565°W, St Mary's college)

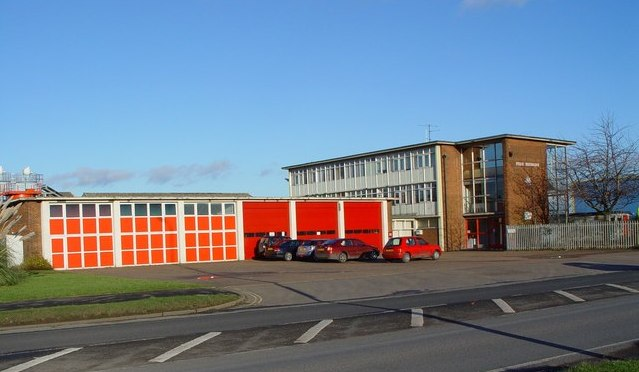
Fire station, Clough Road, built 1959, replaced 2015 (2008)

By the beginning of the 1950s housing development in the Newland area had reached a level that was mostly maintained until the end of the 20th century – overall development consisted of around half housing, the remainder open spaces including allotments, the Northern cemetery, and playing fields, with a large amount of space taken up by the municipal college and university college, as well as other educational establishments – the colleges would expand significantly into some of the open space over the latter part of the 20th century. Minor additions include an estates along Barrington Avenue, and the northernward extension of Cranbrook Avenue; the housing growth along west along Cottingham Road that had begun before the Second World War was practically complete by the end of the 1940s. The land north of Clough Road was further developed industrially around the 1960s, with much of the development being warehousing. A fire station was built on Clough Road in 1959. (Note: 53.767974°N 0.340105°W, Fire station)

The university was greatly expanded after the Second World War, mostly in red brick. Notable additions include the Middleton Hall and (now) Larkin Building (1965–67); and the Gulbenkian Centre (1967–69); both listed structures. Most of the new building was to the north of the 1920s college, and included substantial additions in 1957 (Chemistry Building); the Brynmoor Jones Library (1957–59, an eight-storey expansion added 1966–69); the Hardy Building (1959–63); the nine-storey Loten building (1962–64); the Robert Blackburn building (1965–67); and the Wolfson building (1976). On the north side of the campus a sports centre (1963–65) was built, expanded (2004) by the addition of a sport's science block. The municipal college was also expanded in the post war period – with four new blocks added to the rear (1959–63), plus a dodecagonal timber faced structure, the Loxley building, (c. 1960). (Note: Neave & Neave 2010 erroneously states the building to be octagonal – it has 12 sides.)

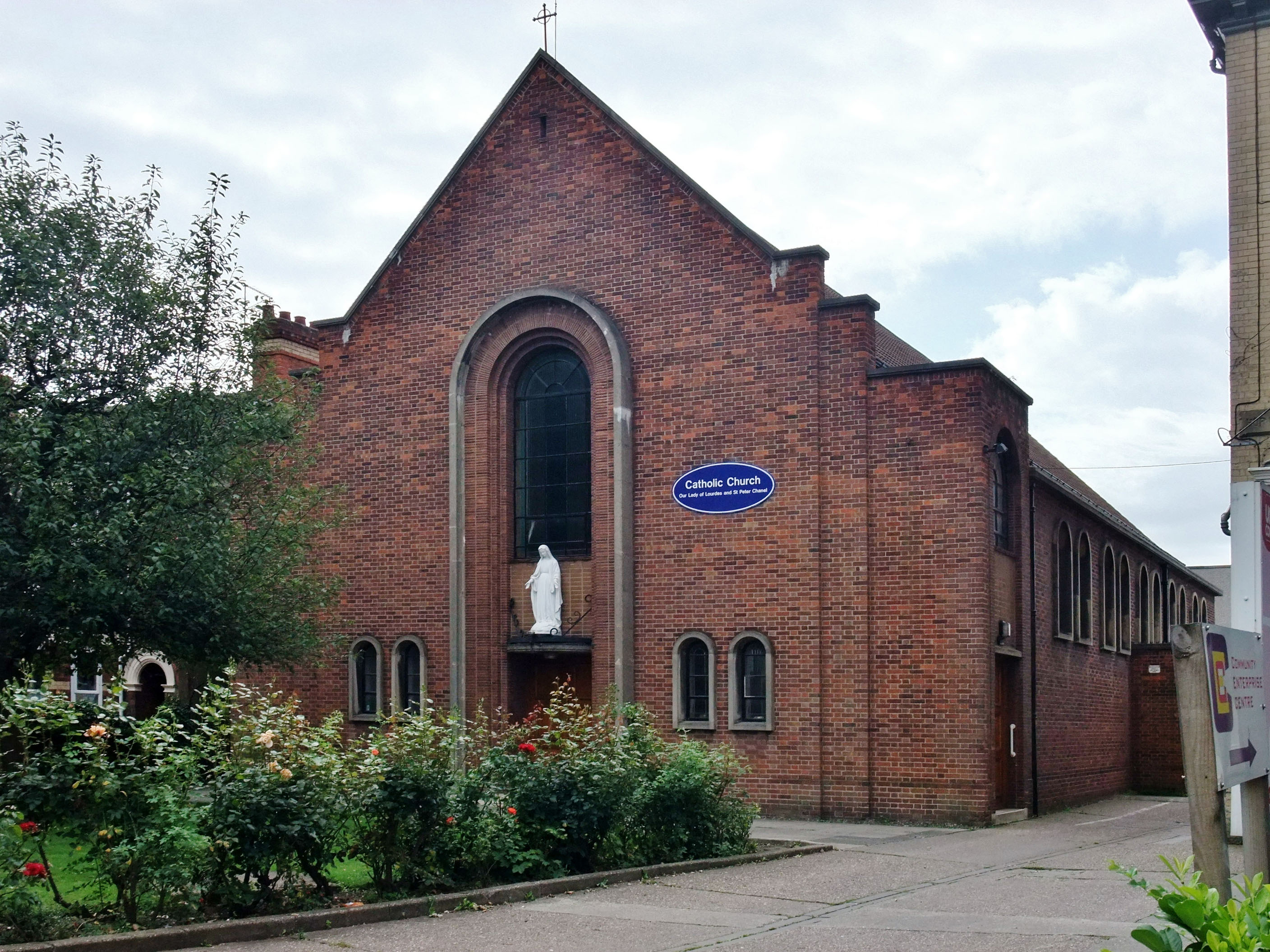
Our Lady of Lourdes and St Peter Chanel, Cottingham Road, 1957 (2011)

In 1957 the Roman Catholic church of Our Lady of Lourdes and St Peter Chanel was built adjacent to the Marist school, replacing the temporary church built 1925 (Note: 53.768535°N 0.361887°W, St Peter Chanel and Lady of Lourdes RC church) The Endsleigh school/teacher training college was further expanded in 1960, and a modern semicircular concrete and brick church, St Antony's, added nearby in 1965. (Note: 53.774426°N 0.357395°W, St Antony's RC church) In 1961 a crematorium was added to the Northern Cemetery, (Note: 53.764862°N 0.376947°W, Cremetorium) replacing the one in Hedon Road Cemetery (see Southcoates). In 1962 Newland St John's CE Primary. (Note: 53.770046°N 0.350869°W, St Johns CE primary school) on Beresford Avenue replaced the 1865 Clough Road parish school. In 1968 a German Lutheran church and Seaman's Mission (after 1992 the Hull Community church) was built on Cottingham Road/Newland Avenue opposite the 1927 Newland Methodist church. The building was of dark brick with a copper roof.

In 1963 the Frederick Holmes school (handicapped) was established on a site on Inglemire Lane. (Note: 53.774207°N 0.376251°W, Frederick Holmes school (site of) / Oakfield Road primary .) (Note: The school was established at the former Industrial School for Girls in 1920 on Park Avenue (The Avenues, Hull))

Land for expansion of the University was acquired in 1967 at the east of its Cottingham Road site. The Wilberforce building (1968–70) predominately built of concrete was the first major addition; University House or Student's Union (1975) was located between the old and new campuses connected to the Wilberforce building by an elevated concrete walkway; a late addition (1991–92) at the far east of the site were the accommodation buildings at Taylor Court.

=== 2000–present ===
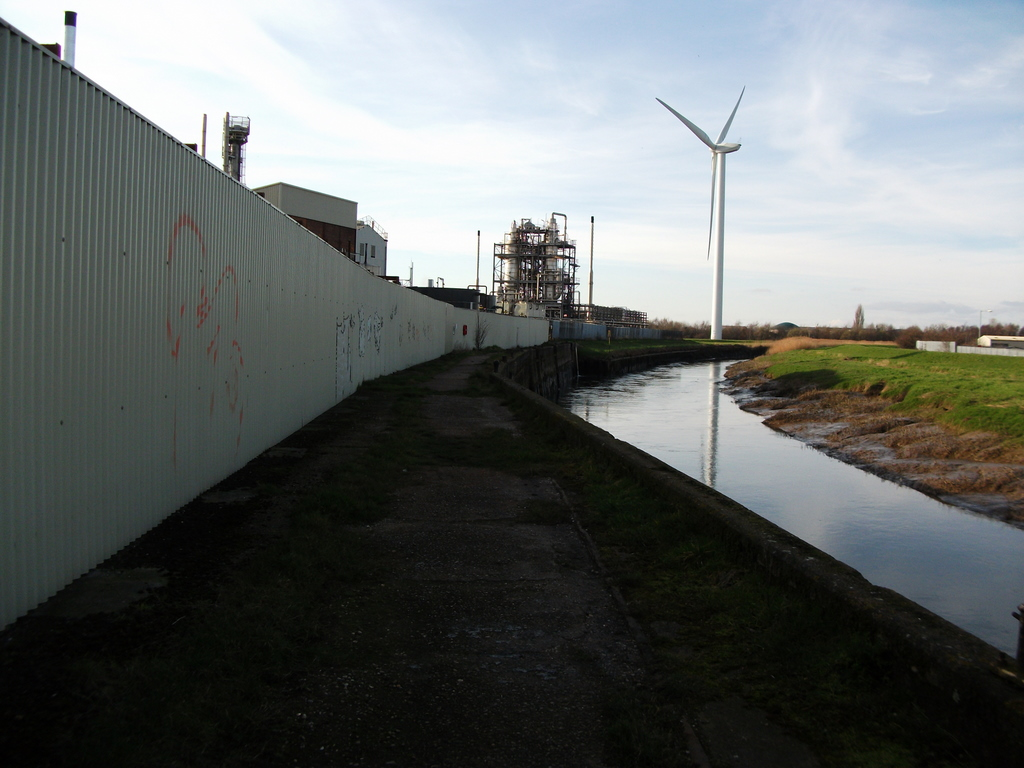
River Hull wharfage at Croda chemical plant, with 2008 wind turbine in distance (2011)

After the acquisition in 2001 by Hull University of the college (then Lincoln University's Hull campus) adjacent west to its own campus a number of changes were made on the site – the main frontage buildings were joined and extended by modern extensions (2005, 2006); an anatomy building was also added (2005).

In 2004 the Hull Community church gained planning permission to demolish the 1968 Lutheran church and construct a new church on the site. In 2004 the Sailor's Orphan Homes were closed following a decline in use. The school was leased to Hull City Council and the houses repurposed as student accommodation. Newland primary school closed 2006, as was later used by the council and community groups. In 2006 planning permission was given for 45 houses on the former Marist College school site. (Developed as Scholar Court.)

Croda installed a 2 MW REpower MM92 wind turbine north of its chemical works in c. 2008.

In 2012 St Marys, Newland Girls, and Frederick Holmes schools were given funding for redeveloped facilities or new buildings as part of the Building Schools for the Future programme. The work at Frederick Holmes included the demolishing of much of the existing school with the adjacent Oakfield school relocated to east Hull in 2013. (Note: The Oakfield school relocated to Hopefield Road, the school was complete in 2013, and officially opened 2014. (See also Preston Road Estate)) At St Mary's a 6,725 square metres (72,390 sq ft) three-storey replacement main school building was to be built to the front the site of a previous school front buildings, and a 1,046 square metres (11,260 sq ft) two-storey sports facilities added. At Newland Girls the work included a two–storey extension to the rear of the eastern wing of the original 1914 building, and a new sports hall to the rear of the school – as part of the plan many later additions and the schools existing sports hall were required to be demolished.

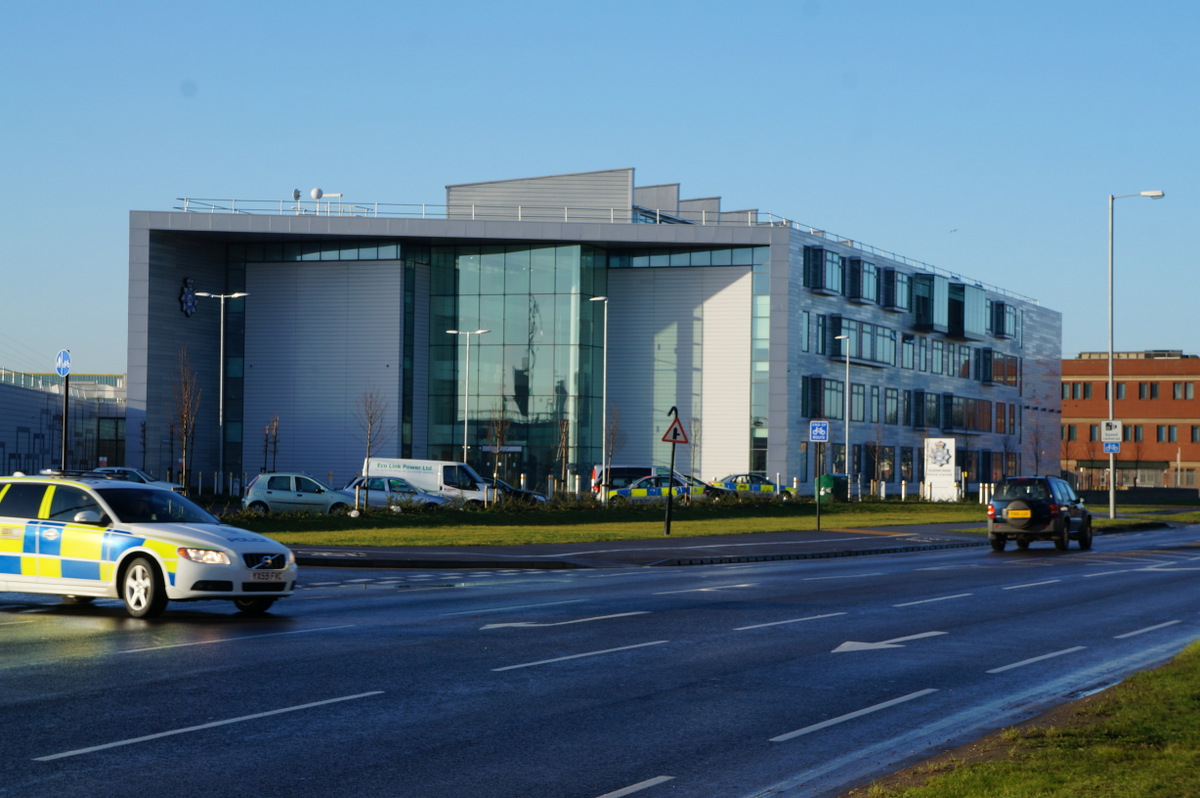
Humberside Police headquarters, Clough Road (2014)

Also in 2012 Humberside Police began relocated to a new £32 million headquarters built on Clough Road. (Note: 53.767262°N 0.340306°W, Humberside Police headquarters) In 2015 a new fire station was opened on Clough Road replacing the 1959 structure.

In 2014 Hull University gained planning permission to build multistorey accommodation blocks on former playing fields on the north side of its Newland campus. On the former Humberside University site planning work began in 2014 for a 'Health Campus' – several low rise buildings were to be demolished and replaced with a five-storey building for use by the Hull York Medical School, the Loxley building was also to be modernised. Work on the new building began early 2016.

In 2015 a fire gutted the then derelict Lambert Street chapel. As a result of the fire much of the church were required to be demolished, with the remaining front facade requiring scaffolding support to prevent collapse.

== Gallery ==
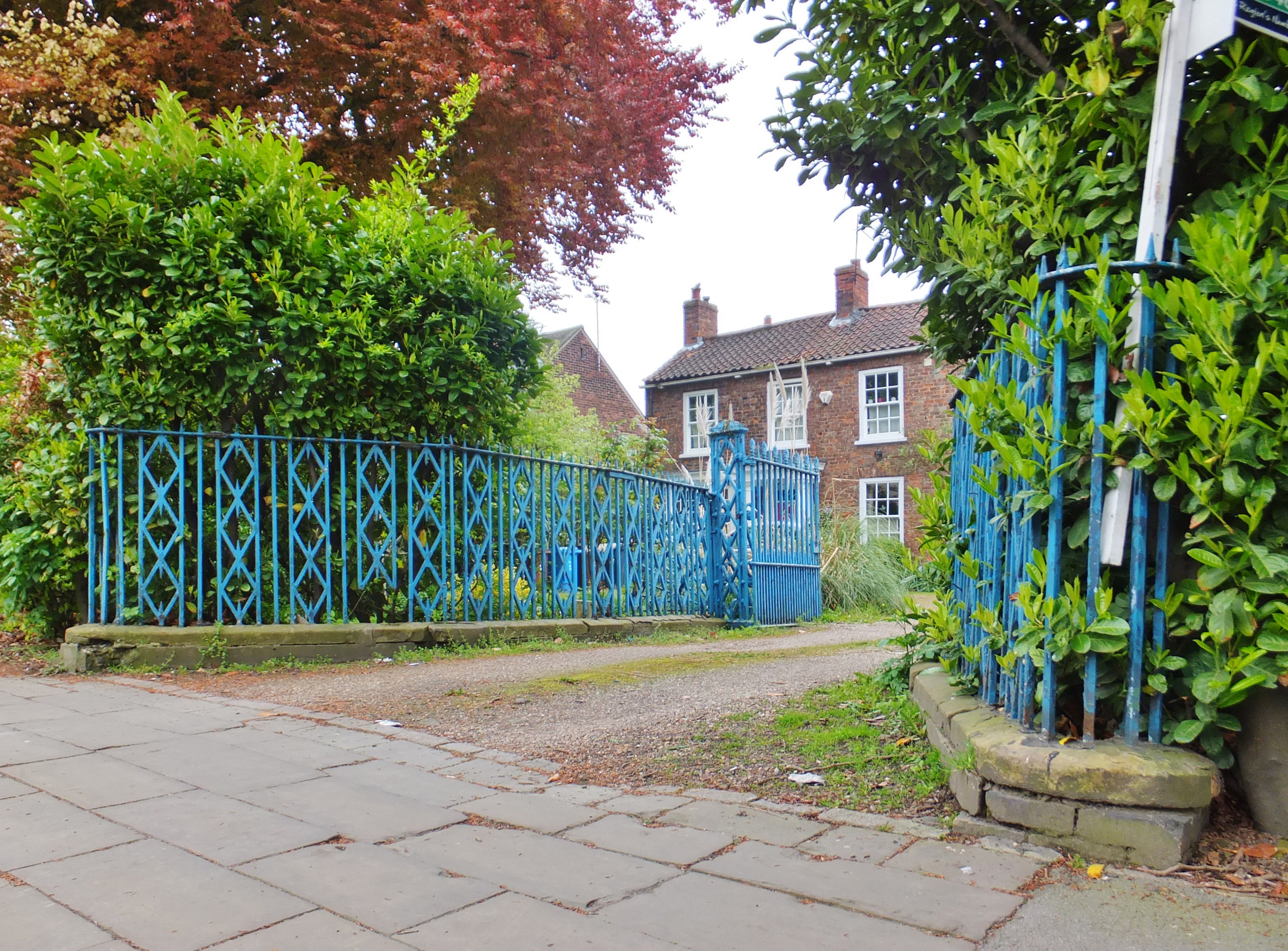
Late 18th century house, former Newland village (2014)

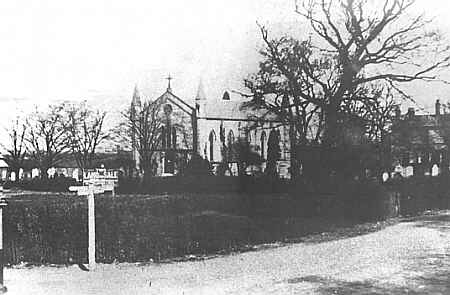
St John's church, built 1833 (Postcard, c. 1900)

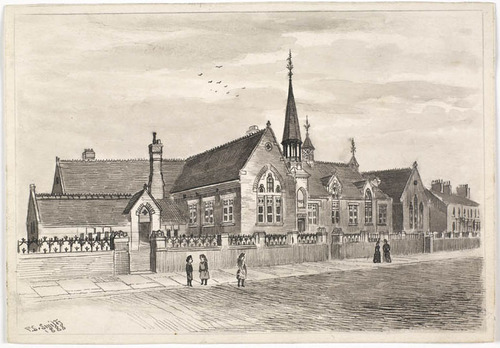
Lambert Street school, built 1879 (F. S. Smith, c. 1888)

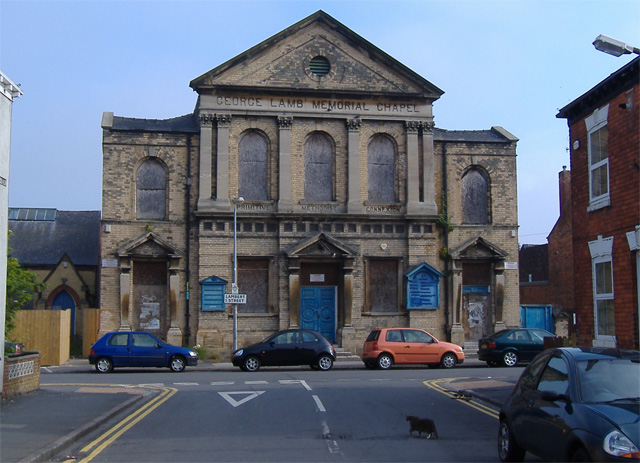
George Lamb Memorial chapel, built 1893 (2007)

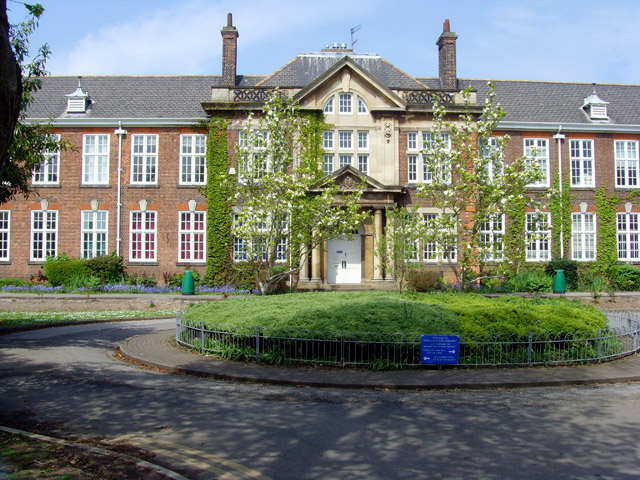
1914 main block of Newland School for Girls (2008)

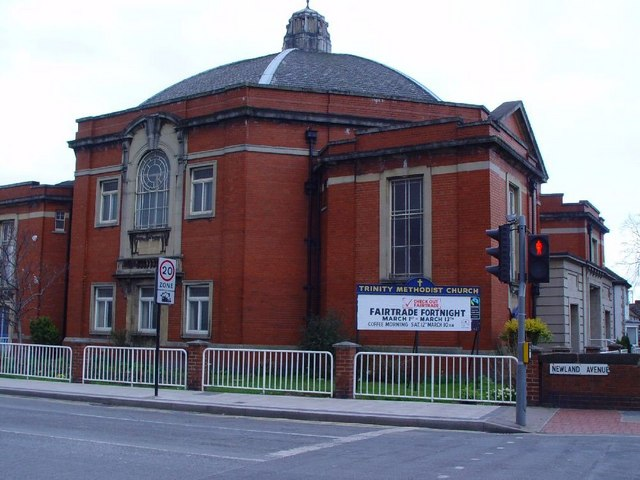
Methodist church, Newland Avenue, built 1928 (2005)

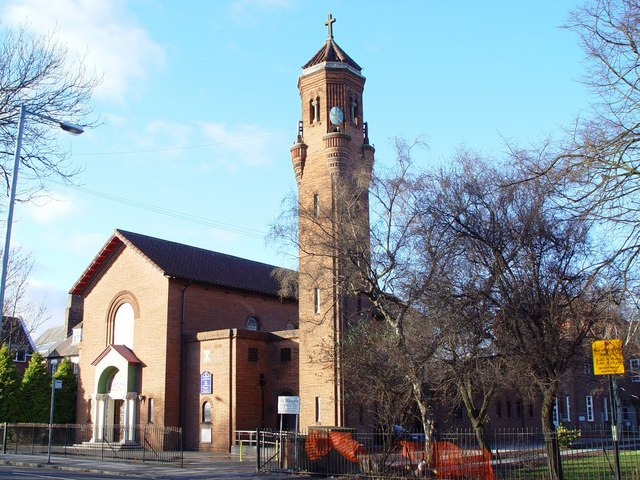
St Vincent de Paul RC church, built 1932 (2008)

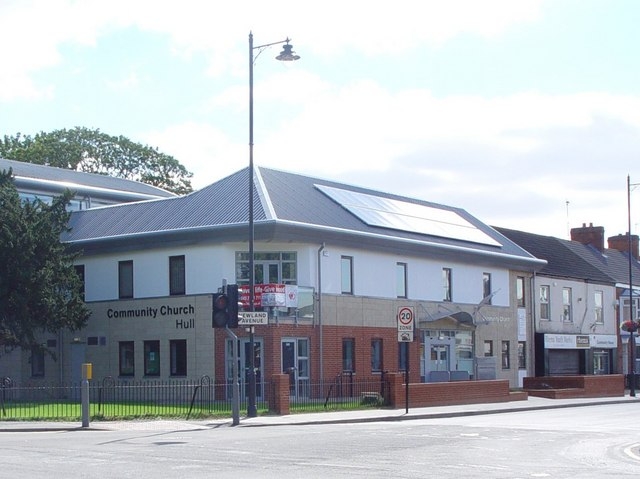
Community church, Newland Avenue, c. 2005 (2007)

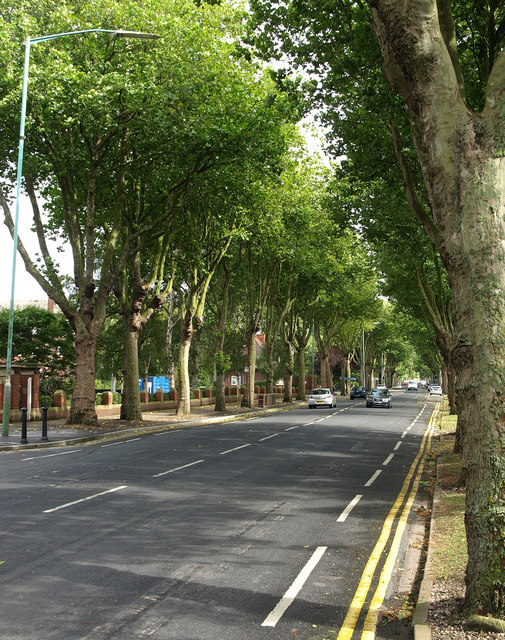
Cottingham Road (2009)

== Community involvement ==
Eileen Harland - A local resident of Newland Avenue known for her community work in improving public spaces. She has led planting schemes, maintained planters, and organised seasonal decorations along the street. In 2019, she accepted the Best Street – Hull in Bloom award on behalf of the Newland Residents’ Association’s Gardening Team. Her work has included Remembrance Day poppy displays, festive street decorations, and involvement in urban planting projects recognised by Woodcraft UK. In 2025, she was a finalist in the BBC Humberside Make A Difference Awards in the Great Neighbour category.
