= Josh Tymon =

English association footballer

Personal information
- Full name: Joshua Lewis Tymon
- Date of birth: 22 May 1999 (age 27)
- Place of birth: Hull, England
- Height: 5 ft 10 in (1.78 m)
- Position: Defender

Team information
- Current team: Swansea City
- Number: 14

Youth career
- 2011–2016: Hull City

Senior career*
| Years | Team | Apps | (Gls) |
| 2016–2017 | Hull City | 5 | (0) |
| 2017–2023 | Stoke City | 106 | (2) |
| 2018 | → Milton Keynes Dons (loan) | 9 | (0) |
| 2019 | → Famalicão (loan) | 5 | (0) |
| 2023– | Swansea City | 144 | (3) |

International career
| 2016 | England U17 | 3 | (0) |
| 2017 | England U18 | 2 | (0) |
| 2017 | England U19 | 4 | (0) |
| 2017–2018 | England U20 | 5 | (0) |
- * Club domestic league appearances and goals as of 20:21, 31 October 2026 (UTC)

Joshua Lewis Tymon (born 22 May 1999) is an English professional footballer who plays as a defender for EFL Championship club Swansea City.

Tymon began his career with his local club Hull City before joining Stoke City in July 2017 following the Tigers' relegation in 2016–17. He spent time on loan at Milton Keynes Dons in 2017–18.

== Early life ==
Tymon was born in Hull, and grew up in the North Hull Estate area where he attended Endike Primary School and played in the Hull Boys' Sunday League with Pelican United, Pinefleet and Skirlaugh. He then went to the Thomas Ferens Academy and lastly, Malet Lambert School. Tymon joined the Hull City academy at the age of twelve and became a regular for the club's under-18s at the age of fifteen.

== Career ==
=== Hull City ===
For the 2015–16 season, Tymon became a regular for the under-21s and began training with the Hull City first-team. Tymon made his professional debut for Hull City on 30 January 2016 in the FA Cup against Bury. He started the match and played 80 minutes of the 3–1 win at Gigg Lane. On 19 November 2016 Tymon made his Premier League debut against Sunderland at the Stadium of Light. On 7 January 2017, he scored his first goal for the club deep in added time after coming on as a substitute for Adama Diomande in the 2–0 FA Cup home win against Swansea City.

=== Stoke City ===
On 5 July 2017, it was announced that Tymon left the club after rejecting new contract offers from Hull City. Later in the day, he joined Stoke City, signing a five-year contract. Tymon made his debut for Stoke on 23 August 2017 in a 4–0 EFL Cup victory over Rochdale. He struggled to make much of impact at Stoke and was made available for a loan move in January. On 30 January 2018, Tymon joined League One club Milton Keynes Dons until the end of the 2017–18 season. Tymon made nine appearances for MK Dons but was unable to help them avoid relegation to EFL League Two. Tymon's only league appearance in the 2018–19 season came against Preston North End on 26 January 2019, he struggled against Darnell Fisher and was substituted just before half time. At the end of the season Tymon revealed that he is unhappy at Stoke after failing to break into the first team.

On 17 July 2019, Tymon agreed to join newly promoted Portuguese club Famalicão on loan for the 2019–20 season. He was signed by João Pedro Sousa, assistant to Marco Silva during his time at Hull. He made his debut on 3 August in the first round of the Taça da Liga, a 2–0 home loss to LigaPro club S.C. Covilhã, and a week later played for the first time in the Primeira Liga in a 2–0 win at C.D. Santa Clara on the opening day. Tymon made five league appearances for Famalicão before being recalled by Stoke in December 2019. Tymon started against Derby County on 31 January 2020 in place of the injured Bruno Martins Indi as Stoke lost 4–0. Tymon didn't make another appearance again until the final day of the season on 22 July 2020 against Nottingham Forest where he came on as a substitute in the 71st minute and provided two assists as Stoke won 4–1. Tymon became a regular member of Michael O'Neill's squad in 2020–21, making 29 appearances in a number of different positions.

Tymon scored his first goal for Stoke in a 1–0 win against Nottingham Forest on 21 August 2021. Tymon signed a new three-and-a-half-year contract with Stoke in December 2021. He was a key member of the team in 2021–22, making 49 appearances, as Stoke finished in 14th. In 2022–23 Tymon competed with Dujon Sterling for the left-back position, playing 31 times as Stoke finished in 16th position.

=== Swansea City ===
On 1 September 2023, Tymon joined Swansea City for an undisclosed fee.

== International career ==
In January 2016, Tymon received his first call-up to the England under-17 side. He made his debut on 5 February 2016 in a 1–1 draw against Portugal under-17 in the Algarve Tournament. He started England's other two fixtures in the tournament against Germany under-17 and the Netherlands under-17. In June 2017, Tymon was a member of an England under-20 side that won the Toulon Tournament.

== Personal life ==
In November 2022, Tymon's home in Knutsford was targeted by thieves who stole his car and jewellery.

== Career statistics ==
As of match played 1 September 2026

Appearances and goals by club, season and competition
| Club | Season | League | | | National cup (Note: Includes FA Cup) | | League cup (Note: Includes EFL Cup, Taça da Liga) | | Other | | Total | |
| Club | Season | Division | Apps | Goals | Apps | Goals | Apps | Goals | Apps | Goals | Apps | Goals |
|---|---|---|---|---|---|---|---|---|---|---|---|---|
| Hull City | 2015–16 | Championship | 0 | 0 | 2 | 0 | 0 | 0 | — | | 2 | 0 |
| Hull City | 2016–17 | Premier League | 5 | 0 | 2 | 1 | 5 | 0 | — | | 12 | 1 |
| Hull City | Total | | 5 | 0 | 4 | 1 | 5 | 0 | — | | 14 | 1 |
| Stoke City | 2017–18 | Premier League | 3 | 0 | 0 | 0 | 2 | 0 | — | | 5 | 0 |
| Stoke City | 2018–19 | Championship | 1 | 0 | 1 | 0 | 0 | 0 | — | | 2 | 0 |
| Stoke City | 2019–20 | Championship | 2 | 0 | 0 | 0 | 0 | 0 | — | | 2 | 0 |
| Stoke City | 2020–21 | Championship | 26 | 0 | 0 | 0 | 3 | 0 | — | | 29 | 0 |
| Stoke City | 2021–22 | Championship | 44 | 1 | 3 | 1 | 2 | 1 | — | | 49 | 3 |
| Stoke City | 2022–23 | Championship | 28 | 1 | 3 | 0 | 0 | 0 | — | | 31 | 1 |
| Stoke City | 2023–24 | Championship | 2 | 0 | 0 | 0 | 2 | 0 | — | | 4 | 0 |
| Stoke City | Total | | 106 | 2 | 7 | 1 | 9 | 1 | — | | 122 | 4 |
| Milton Keynes Dons (loan) | 2017–18 | League One | 9 | 0 | — | | — | | — | | 9 | 0 |
| Famalicão (loan) | 2019–20 | Primeira Liga | 5 | 0 | 0 | 0 | 1 | 0 | — | | 6 | 0 |
| Swansea City | 2023–24 | Championship | 41 | 0 | 0 | 0 | 0 | 0 | — | | 41 | 0 |
| Swansea City | 2024–25 | Championship | 45 | 2 | 1 | 0 | 2 | 0 | — | | 48 | 2 |
| Swansea City | 2025–26 | Championship | 45 | 1 | 1 | 0 | 4 | 0 | — | | 50 | 1 |
| Swansea City | 2026–27 | Championship | 4 | 0 | 1 | 0 | 0 | 0 | — | | 5 | 0 |
| Swansea City | Total | | 135 | 3 | 3 | 0 | 6 | 0 | — | | 144 | 3 |
| Career total | | | 260 | 5 | 14 | 2 | 21 | 1 | — | | 295 | 8 |

== Honours ==
England U20

- Toulon Tournament: 2017

Individual

- EFL Championship Team of the Year: 2025–26
