= Malet Lambert School =

Malet Lambert
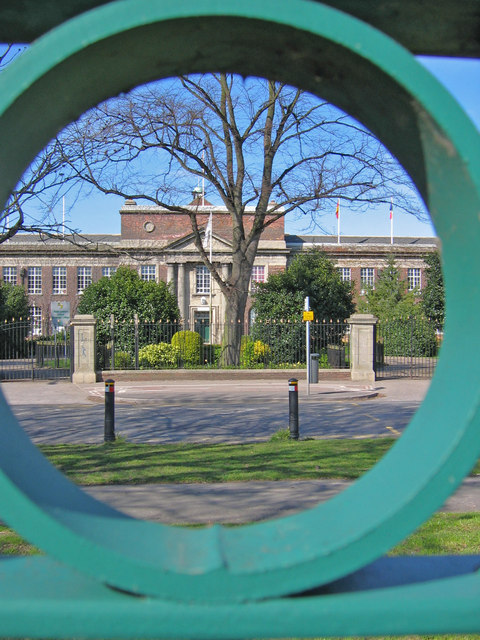

Location
- James Reckitt Avenue; Kingston upon Hull, East Riding of Yorkshire, HU8 0JD; England; 53.76803°N 0.30192°W

Information
- Type: Academy
- Established: 1932
- Founder: Joseph Malet Lambert
- Local authority: Hull City Council
- Department for Education URN: 142150 Tables
- Ofsted: Reports
- Chair of Directors: A Barker
- Head of School: P. Sprakes
- CEO: J. Uttley
- Staff: 160
- Gender: Co-educational
- Age: 11 to 16
- Enrolment: 1456 (as of 2012 Ofsted inspection)
- Colour: Depends on house
- Publication: The Voice
- Website: http://www.maletlambert.co.uk/

Malet Lambert is a secondary school for 11- to 16-year-old pupils in Kingston upon Hull, East Riding of Yorkshire, England. The school is situated on James Reckitt Avenue in the east of the city, its front facade overlooks East Park. Malet Lambert opened in 1932 and became a grammar school in 1944 before becoming a community comprehensive in 1969. The school converted to academy status in September 2015.

== History ==
Malet Lambert opened in September 1932, established by the local education authority, as a replacement for the overcrowded Craven Street Municipal Secondary established in 1893 by the school board as Hull's second higher-grade board school. The original site was on Holderness Road but it was turned down because it was too expensive at £500. A site was chosen along James Reckitt Avenue in the East Hull suburbs, overlooking East Park. The main school building was designed as a two-storey Neo-Georgian building, with a central spine encompassing offices, library, assembly hall and gymnasium. All the classrooms were to face south, extending out in two wings with the science laboratories along the sides. Originally, girls were taught in the first floor classrooms and boys on the ground floor, a system which was kept in place for many years.

The school became a co-educational grammar school for 11- to 18-year-olds as a result of the Education Act 1944 and in 1968 it became a community comprehensive school.

The original building was designed to accommodate about 600 pupils. New ancillary rooms to the rear of the main hall, changing rooms and two Physics laboratories were constructed in 1955. Followed in 1961 by a building known as the 'Glass House' which was used for Home Economics (the building was demolished in 2000). A Sixth Form centre was constructed in 1972 and converted into a music block in 1986. A sports centre was built to the west of the main building in 1985 and the West Playshed was converted into an art block in 1995. A new Technology block opened in 2000 following the demolition of the existing accommodation and a building for the use of Science and Geography was opened in 2001 by Lord Dearing and named The Dearing Centre.

Malet Lambert had a sixth form until the reorganisation of schools in Hull in 1988, which saw the disappearance of sixth forms in Hull state schools.

Malet Lambert was refurbished as part of Building Schools for the Future (BSF). The school was placed into 'Phase 1' of the Hull scheme in 2006 and preliminary plans were drawn up in 2008. After consultation with staff, pupils and the community, revised plans were drawn up by HKS architects in the summer of 2010. The £22 million scheme was a part rebuild/part remodel. Only 3 of the 10 original buildings (The Main Building, The Dearing Centre and The Lodge) were retained. A new dedicated sports centre was constructed on the west field behind the existing sports hall along with a new staff car park, 3G pitch and netball courts. The main Neo-Georgian school building was extensively refurbished both internally and externally, restoring it back to its former elegance with the integration of new technology. A new two-storey rear extension, connected to the existing main building, was constructed. This encloses the two quad areas, one of which is covered with an ETFE transparent roof and became the school's new dining facility. The Dearing Centre, which was built in 2001 to house Science and Geography, was internally remodelled, the remodelling started in the 2012 October half term. Construction work began in March 2011 with completion in September 2012. School building work was completed by September 2012, with external landscaping completed by the end of 2012.

In December 2022, a new extension for 150 pupils was opened.

== Headteachers ==
- 1932 to 1951: Harry Shoosmith
- 1951 to 1970: Mr L Parslow
- 1970 to 1973: Eric Davies
- 1973 to 1978: John Andrews
- 1978 to 2006: Sheila Ireland
- 2006 to 2015: Jane Disbery
- 2015 to 2016: Chris Abbott
- 2016 to present: Patrick Sprakes

== Present ==
As of 2012 Malet Lambert educates over 1,400 pupils of both sexes, aged between 11 and 16. The school is oversubscribed, its students are of mostly white British background. There is an average of 300 students in each of the school's 5 years with an average class size of 28. It teaches a variety of languages such as French, German, Russian, Spanish and Chinese. French is compulsory in the first year, with further options available later.

In 2011 67% of the school's pupils achieved the five or more GCSE A*-C grades including English and Maths, having increased steadily from 45% in 2007; since the introduction of school league tables the school has scored in the top quartile of schools in the Hull area, and average for the UK as a whole. In April 2012 Malet Lambert received an inspection from Ofsted, the school was given a 'Good' rating in every inspection category.

== Notable former teachers ==
- Eva Crackles MBE (1918–2007), botanist, notable for her major contributions to the Atlas of the British Flora, head of biology at Malet Lambert until her retirement in 1978.

== Notable former pupils ==
- Robert Aramayo, actor (I Swear)
- Karl Bushby, adventurer
- Max Clark, footballer
- Josh Tymon, footballer
- Liam Cooper, premier league footballer and captain of Leeds United
- Baron Dearing, of Kingston upon Hull in the County of the East Riding of Yorkshire. Former chairman of Royal Mail and Chancellor of the University of Nottingham (1993–2000) and the author of the Dearing Report into Higher Education.
- Steven Patterson, Yorkshire County cricketer (2005–2022) and captain (2018–2022)
- Jack Harrison VC, MC, pupil at the forerunning Craven Street School 1901–10. Teacher and Hull FC player; died 3 May 1917 at Oppy Wood, Pas-de-Calais awarded posthumous Victoria Cross. There is a memorial plaque in the school hall.
- Pat Heard (1978–1993), professional footballer; Everton, Aston Villa, Sheffield Wednesday, Newcastle, Middlesbrough, Hull City, Rotherham and Cardiff.
- Edward Jarvis FRHistS, historian, author
- Johnny Pat BEM (born John Henry Paterson), musician and charity fundraiser, frontman of The Aces
- Jean Rook, who was dubbed The First Lady of Fleet Street, a journalist of The Yorkshire Post, Daily Sketch and most successfully The Daily Express
- Scott Wiseman, Professional Footballer for Hull City and Numerous other football league teams and Lincoln Red Imps. International for Gibraltar. Gibraltar Women's team manager.
