= St John's Church, Newland =

Church of England parish church in Kingston upon Hull, England

- Saint John Newland
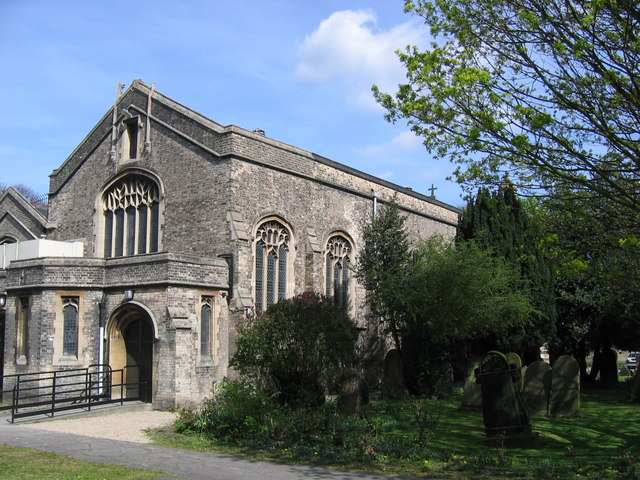
- St John's Church, Newland
- 53.768849°N 0.352545°W
- OS grid reference: TA 0868 3154
- Location: Kingston upon Hull
- Country: England
- Denomination: Church of England
- Churchmanship: Evangelical Anglicanism
- Website: www.stjohnnewland.org.uk

History
- Status: Vicar
- Consecrated: 23 September 1833

Architecture
- Functional status: Active
- Heritage designation: Grade II
- Designated: 21 January 1994

Administration
- Province: Province of York
- Diocese: York

Clergy
- Archbishop: Stephen Cottrell
- Bishop: Eleanor Sanderson
- Vicar(s): Revd Jacob Madin, Revd Hannah Madin

St John's Church, Newland, also known simply as St John Newland, is an Anglican evangelical church located in the parish of Newland in the city of Kingston upon Hull, England.

== History ==
The church was built by Avison Terry, a leading evangelical layman and prominent citizen of Hull who was twice mayor of Hull (1827 and 1829) and once Sheriff (1813) of the city. He raised public subscriptions to pay for the construction on a site close to his home of Newland Grove at a cost of £1,650. The church was consecrated by the Archbishop of York on 23 September 1833.

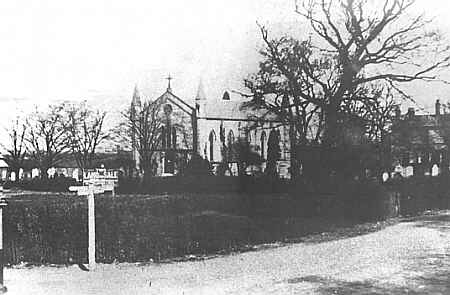
The original St John's building before extensions

The original building was of a simple box construction with a balcony at the rear. It could house a congregation of around 500, which at the time was about the population of the local area, although average attendance was closer to 100.

Initially, Saint John's was a daughter church to Saint Mary's in Cottingham, and services were held on Sunday afternoons to accommodate the ministers’ schedules. Avison Terry, not being satisfied with this less than ideal arrangement, set out to raise further money so that St John's could have a minister of its own. In October 1862, The Reverend John Pickford was selected by Reverend Charles Overton of St Mary's Cottingham. In 1863, the vicarage at St John's was completed, as well as a parish school, again by funds raised by Avison Terry.

Avison Terry died in 1866, and was buried in the vaults which then existed beneath the church. Later modifications to the building removed the vaults and his grave is now found in the churchyard close to the south side of the church building.

In 1881 the Reverend Joseph Malet Lambert was appointed vicar of Saint John's, and remained with the church for 30 years. He was instrumental in expanding the original building and added the chancel to the east in 1893. In 1902 more significant works were carried out, extending the nave westward, removing the balcony and adding a north aisle separated from the nave by an arcade of six stone arches. The burials in the vaults were removed to the churchyard and the floor level lowered, and the windows changed from a tall narrow design to wider arched structures.

A creche and office rooms were added to the west end in 1958, and the exterior of the building remains much as it was then.

In 2013, the fixed pews were removed and the seating arrangements turned 90 degrees. A screen, projector, cameras for streaming the services and a new sound system were installed blending the original architecture with 21st century congregational needs and evangelical belief and practice.

=== Tinker and split from Church of England ===
The Reverend Melvin Tinker, served as Vicar from 1994 to 2020. He was one of the founding members of the conservative evangelical group Reform. He has spoken out against gay pride and the blessing of the 2015 parade held in York by a canon of York Minster. After calling for repentance from John Sentamu, the then Archbishop of York, for his supporting a ban on gay conversion therapy, he stopped voluntary donations (approximately £47,000 a year) from the parish to the Diocese of York.

St John's Church developed connections with REACH South Africa, George Whitefield College in Cape Town, Champion Forest Baptist Church in Houston, Texas, and the Lanier Theological Library, Houston, Texas. It also identified as a member of GAFCON.

By 2020, the church had over 500 people (including 100 children). The leadership team included two associate ministers, the Reverend Scott McKay and the Reverend Peter Birnie. In August 2020, Melvin Tinker resigned his post entering into retirement from the Church of England. A network of independent Anglican churches, entitled 'Christ Church Network' Hull, was then formed out of the St John's congregations with the majority joining the new network under the senior leadership of Scott McKay. Christ Church Newland and Christ Church Riverside subsequently joined the Anglican Mission in England.

=== Present day ===
A weekly service at St John's Church was restarted on 4 October 2020, under the leadership of interim vicar, the Reverend Canon Erik Wilson. In December 2020, it was announced that Richard White would become vicar in June 2021. Revd. White was licensed on 28 June 2021. Revd. White left in August 2024 to become Rector of the St Aldhelm Benefice, Purbeck.

The Revd Jacob Madin, Multiply Minister of Scarborough St Mary with Holy Apostles, was appointed as Vicar in 2025, and collated by the Bishop of Hull on Tuesday 6 May. He was joined by Revd Hannah Madin, his wife, who was made an assistant curate.
