= Sir Henry Cooper School =

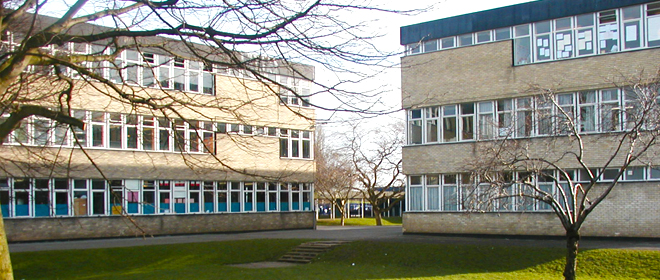

Location
- Thorpepark Road; Kingston upon Hull, East Riding of Yorkshire, HU6 9ES; England; 53.79312°N 0.37398°W

Information
- Type: Secondary school
- Motto: 'Achievement for all in a caring environment'
- Established: 1967
- Closed: 2012
- Local authority: Hull
- Department for Education URN: 118105 Tables
- Ofsted: Reports
- Age: 11 to 16

Sir Henry Cooper School was a coeducational, secondary school located on Thorpepark Road in Orchard Park Estate, Kingston upon Hull, England. On the school ground is the North Site of the Hull City Learning Centre, no longer part of the City Learning Centres, in the school Information Technology building.

== History ==
In 1854 Sir Henry Cooper was elected Mayor of Hull and, on the occasion of the visit of Queen Victoria in October of that year, he received a knighthood. He became a member and first chairman of the Hull School Board in 1871. When the Board Schools opened in 1876 at Bean Street, Hull, they were named the 'Sir Henry Cooper Schools' and, following their closure, the name was transferred to this school when it opened in September 1967.

Sir Henry Cooper School closed in 2012, with pupils transferring to the newly built Thomas Ferens Academy. The building of the academy, sponsored by the University of Hull, met local opposition, with concerns that construction could cause "flooding, traffic problems and loss of green space". The school was renamed Sirius Academy North in 2015.

At the west end of Adelaide Terrace was the entrance to Bean Street. Originally a short street leading to an old farm, the street was shown, un-named, and with only a few buildings on Wilkinson’s plan of Hull of 1848. It was originally named “New” Jarratt Street to avoid confusion with the older Jarratt Street in the centre of Hull, and was still named as such on the 1852 Ordnance Survey plan of Hull, when it led only as far as an old-established farm, whose land and buildings initially prevented its further development. Slightly later, a new street called Bean Street was being developed from the north side of the Hessle Road (most likely to have been named in honour of Alderman Robert Bean, a brewer and maltster, who was chairman of the Property Committee in the 1840s). Bean Street was laid out c.1869, and the 1871 Census lists many occupied houses on the street and terraces running off it. It developed north, eventually joining the older New Jarratt Street that ran south from Anlaby Road. As the two became joined c.1871. The Sir Henry Cooper Board School was situated in Bean Street, opening in 1876, it was named after the School Board’s first chairman. There were 900 places after 1903, for boys girls and infants, Average attendance was 813 in 1904, and 543 in 1938. The boys were transferred to Boulevard High School in 1957 leaving only the senior girls and infants departments. The school was demolished c.1966; the transfer of the land (0.625 acres) was noted in the Town Planning Officer’s annual report for 1967/68. A new Sir Henry Cooper High School was built on the Orchard Park Estate around the same time. The huge population of Bean Street (it was said that more people lived in Bean Street than the whole of Withernsea) was served by two pubs; a small beer-house called the Engineers Arms, which opened c.1872, and closed in the 1960s.

From September 2012 to September 2013 the school site was the temporary home of Newland School for Girls, while its own buildings were reconstructed.

Teachers Mr Carvell and Mr Ellerby were voted among the most memorable teachers from the school.

== Notable former pupils ==
- Dave Hemingway
- Hugh Whitaker
- Daniel Smales
- David Rotheray
