= Newland Allotments =

English community garden

- Interactive map of Newland Allotments
- Type: Community Allotment
- Location: Hull, HU5
- Coordinates: 53.765710°N 0.364180°W
- Area: 22 acres (8.90 ha)
- Owner: Hull City Council
- Manager: Newland Allotments Tenants Association
- Open: All Year
- Plots: 270+
- Facilities: Toilets
- Website: Official website

Newland Allotments is a historic community garden established in the 1800s and located in the suburb Newland in Hull, East Riding of Yorkshire, England. It is one of 21 sites across the city. Sitting within 22 acres of land, and with 270 plots on site, it is the largest allotment site in the city and East Yorkshire. The allotment site is classified as statutory, providing protection under the Allotments Act 1925. As statutory allotments, they cannot be sold or repurposed without the consent of the Secretary of State.

== History ==
Founded in the 19th century, Newland Allotments has a history tied to the cultural and agricultural heritage of Hull. Over the years, it has transitioned from a traditional allotment space to a community garden that incorporates sustainable practices. As Newland Allotments land is owned by the local authority and classed as a statutory site, it is protected by the Allotments Acts.

In February 1909, the first on-site association was created, known as "Newland Corporation Allotments Society."

By 1910, the association was renamed "Newland Horticultural Society." Later that year, on 3 September 1910, the society held its first annual flower and vegetable show, opened at Cottingham Road to the public by Mr. W. Stephenson, the society's president. The judging was done by Mr. H. B. Witty, the park superintendent.

In 1916, during the First World War, new cultivation rules were suggested, requiring that two-thirds of each plot be dedicated to growing vegetables to increase the local food supply. The council requested funds for fencing and water supply to safeguard the allotment site.

In January 1917, amid the food demands caused by World War One, the Cultivation of Lands Order Act was passed, empowering local authorities to use unoccupied land for food production. Newland Allotments complied with the act, fully tenanted with 146 plots. Tenants were allowed to keep pigs, rabbits, and poultry under certain conditions. The council provided seeds, manure, and tools and managed bulk seed potato distribution due to rationing. By December, compulsory food rationing was implemented, with allotment holders encouraged to grow early-season vegetables.

In 1943, after the Hull Blitz, an Allotment Protection Association was formed to safeguard the site. A meeting took place at Sidmouth Primary School, attended by over 150 tenants.

In 1987, the city council's leisure services committee blocked a bid to turn two acres of the Newland Allotments into a playing field for Sidmouth Street Primary School, which would have resulted in the loss of 40 allotments.

In 2010, Newland Allotments was recognised as a significant site in the Hull Biodiversity Action Plan, highlighting its importance to local biodiversity.

In 2012, the completed toilet block officially was completed, a project completed in partnership with Hull City Council for the allotment site, and Sidmouth Primary School, the toilet block was opened on 3 July 2012.

In 2013, the Wyke Area Committee allocated £15,000 for the repair and refurbishment of the tracks and roads within the Newland Allotments site.

In 2014, there was a rise in allotment waiting lists, reflecting a national trend. At that time, there were 557 people on the waiting list for allotments in the Wyke Area of Hull, which includes Newland Allotments.

Between 2018 and 2020, the site experienced a string of break-ins. In 2018, multiple incidents occurred, including the theft of over 20 chickens and ducks from the allotment site. The break-ins continued into 2020, affecting over 30 plot holders.

Throughout the COVID-19 pandemic, the site remained open and saw a rise in the waiting list.

In 2024, Newland Allotments hosted BBC Gardeners' Question Time, a long-running BBC Radio 4 programme where amateur gardeners can pose questions to a panel of experts. The event was held at Middleton Hall, within the University of Hull, on 10 September 2024.

During several appearances on BBC Radio Humberside, representatives from Newland Allotments emphasised the importance of community engagement in gardening. They also discussed their upcoming hosting of BBC Gardeners' Question Time, noting how the allotment fosters collaboration and support, aligning with the programme’s goal of providing expert guidance to a wider audience. In a further interview with Newland Allotments the site has become a great community hub.

In July 2025, BBC News featured Newland Allotments in a segment about the hosepipe ban that came into effect that day, highlighting concerns from local allotment holders about the potential impact on crop irrigation.

in August 2025, the allotments was recognised locally for its annual produce show, which showcases the work of plot-holders and has welcomed guest judges such as BBC Radio Humberside presenter Doug Stewart.

== Site features ==
The site is part managed with Hull City Council and Newland Allotments Tenants Association. The allotment site encompasses over 270 plots spanning over 22 acres, each contributing to the lush green landscape of Newland. The size of plots on the Newland Allotments are the equivalent of 250sq metres (size of a doubles tennis court). The land is also used for growing ornamental plants or for keeping useful creatures such as egg-laying poultry or even honey-making bees. The allotment site in popular in this urban setting of Hull where big gardens are a luxury. These plots provide individuals, families and charities with opportunities to engage in gardening activities, fostering a connection to nature and promoting a healthy lifestyle. The site has a community hut, orchard, wild life pond known as the lagoon, garden and on site toilet facilities, all of which are managed by the onsite volunteering team Newland Allotments Tenants Association (N.A.T.A).

The Lagoon

The Hut

The Orchard

The Garden

== Community engagement ==
Eileen Harland, a long standing tenant at Newland Allotments, is recognised for her voluntary work within the local area. She uses surplus produce from her allotment to support those in need in the Newland and wider Hull community. Harland also helps to keep the nearby streets around Newland clean and seasonally decorated, and has been recognised by various community organisations for her continued efforts.

== Projects and initiatives ==
=== Bakersville Allotment ===
Launched in 2000, the Bakersville Allotment project began as a single plot and has since expanded to several plots within the site. The project was initiated by local NHS teams to support individuals receiving care from the Humber NHS Foundation Trust. It provides a space for those with mental health conditions to engage in horticulture as part of their therapy.

=== Let's Talk ===
Launched in 2014 by City Health Care Partnership, the "Let’s Talk" programme supports individuals with anxiety, depression, and other mental health challenges. The programme includes therapeutic gardening at Newland Allotments, where participants grow produce and build structures to improve mental well-being. This service is provided in collaboration with Humber NHS Foundation Trust and other local organisations.

=== P.A.U.L For Brain Recovery ===
P.A.U.L For Brain Recovery supports individuals in Hull affected by acquired brain injury (ABI). The project offers guidance, education, and group activities in a supportive environment. PBS Construction assisted in developing the allotment, providing healthy outdoor activities. These activities aim to reduce social isolation, build friendships, and promote mental well-being.

=== Down to Earth ===
Down to Earth is a community project promoting environmental stewardship through workshops on topics like food cultivation, pest control, and nature photography. The project played a significant role in the Hull Food Partnership's Food Action Plan, increasing food skills and knowledge in the community. Down to Earth has also collaborated on initiatives to boost local food production and has been highlighted by BBC Humberside. The project received a grant from the National Lottery Community Fund to support its efforts.

=== Good to Go ===
Good to Go is a programme for young adults aged 18 to 29 with learning disabilities, physical impairments, and long-term health conditions in Hull and the East Riding. The 12-week programme includes activities like allotment work, cooking, fitness, and community volunteering. It aims to develop participants' social and life skills, helping them integrate into their communities. The programme is part of the Humber Learning Consortium's "This Ability" initiative, funded by the UK Government and the National Lottery Community Fund.

=== Nathaniels Allotment ===
Founded in 2017, Nathaniels Allotment is an online presence within the gardening community. The project began as an effort to transform a plot of land and has grown into a space focused on homegrown produce and sustainable practices documented through social media. It was featured in Kitchen Garden Magazine in December 2021, highlighting its impact on both the gardening and online communities. In an interview with BBC Radio Humberside, they emphasised the importance of encouraging people to start gardening, regardless of experience, using social media to inspire others.
