= Melvin Tinker =

British clergyman (1955–2021)

Melvin Tinker (27 June 1955 – 23 November 2021) was an English evangelical Anglican clergyman. He was senior minister of St John's Church, Newland from 1994 to 2020, when he left the Church of England.

Tinker was born on 27 June 1955 in Mansfield, Nottinghamshire. He later attended Hull University and Wycliffe Hall, Oxford. He was one of the founding members of Reform.

Tinker wrote 19 books, including several on the relationship between Christianity and culture, such as Alien Nation: The Growing Isolation of the Church from today's Culture (Christian Focus Publications, 2002) and That Hideous Strength: How the West was lost (Evangelical Press, 2018), as well as producing a large number of other written articles for various Christian publications and websites.

He died from pancreatic cancer on 23 November 2021, at the age of 66.
