= Ronald Good =

British botanist

Ronald D'Oyley Good
- Born: 5 March 1896; Dorchester, Dorset, England
- Died: 11 December 1992 (aged 96); Kingston upon Hull, England
- Education: Downing College, Cambridge
- Occupation: Botanist
- Scientific career
- Fields: Botany
- Workplaces: University of Hull
- Doctoral students: Eva Crackles

Ronald D'Oyley Good (5 March 1896 – 11 December 1992) was a British botanist notable for his floristic regionalization.

Good was born in Dorchester. He studied botany at Downing College, Cambridge, where he obtained an MA and Sc.D. He worked at the Botany Department of the Natural History Museum (1922–1928). He worked at the Botany Department at the University of Hull from 1928 until his retirement in 1959. He was the author of The Geography of the Flowering Plants (1947) a popular work in botany.

== Publications ==
The standard author abbreviation R.D.Good is used to indicate this person as the author when citing a botanical name.

- Plants and Human Economics (1933)
- The Old Roads of Dorset (1940); 1966 new, enlarged edition. ISBN 0950326119.
- A Geographical Handbook of the Dorset Flora (1948)
- The Geography of the Flowering Plants (1947; 2nd ed. 1953, 3rd ed. 1964, 4th ed. 1974)
- Features of Evolution in Flowering Plants (1956)
- The Lost Villages of Dorset (1979) ISBN 0950351857
- The Philosophy of Evolution (1981) ISBN 0950351865
- Concise Flora of Dorset (1984) ISBN 090034119X
