= St Nicholas Primary School, Hull =

St Nicholas Primary School
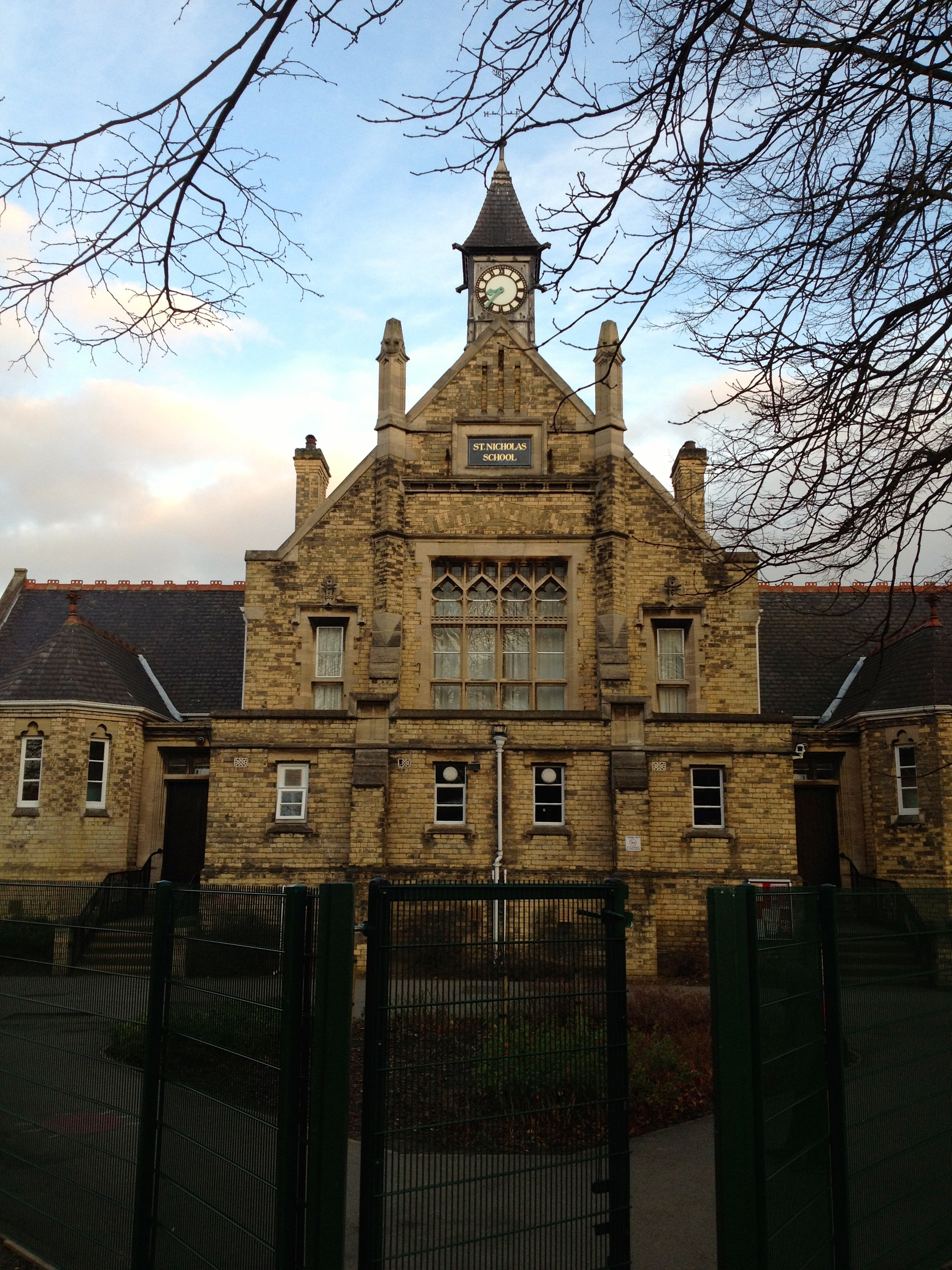

Location
- Cottingham Road; Kingston upon Hull, East Riding of Yorkshire, HU6 7RH; England; 53°46′12″N 0°21′31″W

Information
- Type: Academy
- Motto: A small school with a big heart and a love of learning
- Established: 1897
- Local authority: Hull City Council
- Department for Education URN: 140906 Tables
- Ofsted: Reports
- Chair of Governors: John Howarth
- Headteacher: Caroline Skipper
- Staff: 45
- Gender: Mixed
- Age: 4 to 11
- Enrolment: 201
- Colours: Red and White
- Website: https://saintnicholasprimary.org.uk/

St Nicholas Primary School is a coeducational primary school in Newland, Kingston upon Hull, England, for pupils aged 4 to 11.

== Details ==
The school is located in the Newland area of West Hull. This school was built around 1897 in a Renaissance Revival style, now with late twentieth-century additions, and is now a Grade II listed building.

== History ==
For the first 108 years of its history, the school was run by The Port of Hull Society for the Religious Instruction of Seamen, founded in 1821, concerned with the welfare of sailor's orphans. In 1950 it changed its name to The Sailors' Children's Society.

From 1937 to 2002, Queen Elizabeth the Queen Mother was patron of the society, and in 1960 she visited the school.

In 2005 an agreement was reached with Hull City Council to take over responsibility for the school.

In August 2015 the school converted to academy status.
