= Orchard Park Estate =

Estate in Kingston upon Hull, East Riding of Yorkshire, England

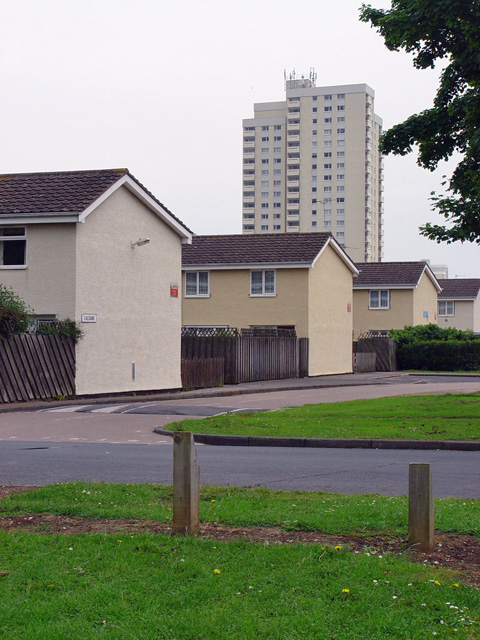
- Caldane, with Milldane flats behind, Danepark (2008)

- Location within the East Riding of Yorkshire
- OS grid reference: TA068339
- Unitary authority: Kingston upon Hull
- Ceremonial county: East Riding of Yorkshire
- Region: Yorkshire and the Humber
- Country: England
- Sovereign state: United Kingdom
- Post town: HULL
- Postcode district: HU6
- Dialling code: 01482
- Police: Humberside
- Fire: Humberside
- Ambulance: Yorkshire
- UK Parliament: Kingston upon Hull North

Orchard Park Estate is an area or housing estate situated on the north-western side of Kingston upon Hull, England.

== Geography ==
The Orchard Park Estate is on the northern eastern fringe of the western part Kingston upon Hull adjacent to the city boundary. Cottingham, East Riding of Yorkshire is one mile (1.6 km) directly to the west; the North Hull Estate (Greenwood Avenue) is contiguous adjacent to the south; the eastern boundary is formed by the Beverley and Barmston Drain, beyond which is more housing, and the River Hull (0.5 mi (0.8 km)); to the north is open farmland.

As of 2014 primary schools in the area are Thorpepark Primary; The Parks Primary Academy; and St Anthony's (Roman Catholic).

=== Population and environment ===
Population at the 2001 and 2011 censuses was around 4,600, with the inhabitants being mainly white families (over 90%), predominately working class. Social housing represented 68% of all housing stock in 2011 (75% in 2001). Unemployment was extremely high in both national and local terms, at 27%. The area has suffered historically from a self re-inforcing negative perceptions of the area, resulting in low house prices and low desirability of properties; the layout of the estate has been characterised as a poorly implemented 'bastardised' version of the Radburn layout, seen as leading to problems around ownership of public spaces, such as parking areas.

== History ==
Prior to the estate's development the land was open drained farmland; the northernmost housing development was on the south side of Orchard Park Road (formerly North Carr Lane, dating to at least 1850s). At the west side of the crossing of the road and the Beverley & Barmston drain (Cold Harbour Bridge) was Orchard Park Farm (formerly Cold Harbour farm).

In the 1930s the development of the North Hull Estate brought the urban growth of Hull to the edge of North Carr Lane. A church St Michael and All Angels was built on the north side of North Carr Lane c. 1934; it was replaced by another church c. 1955–7, with the older building reused as a church hall.

=== 1960–2000 ===
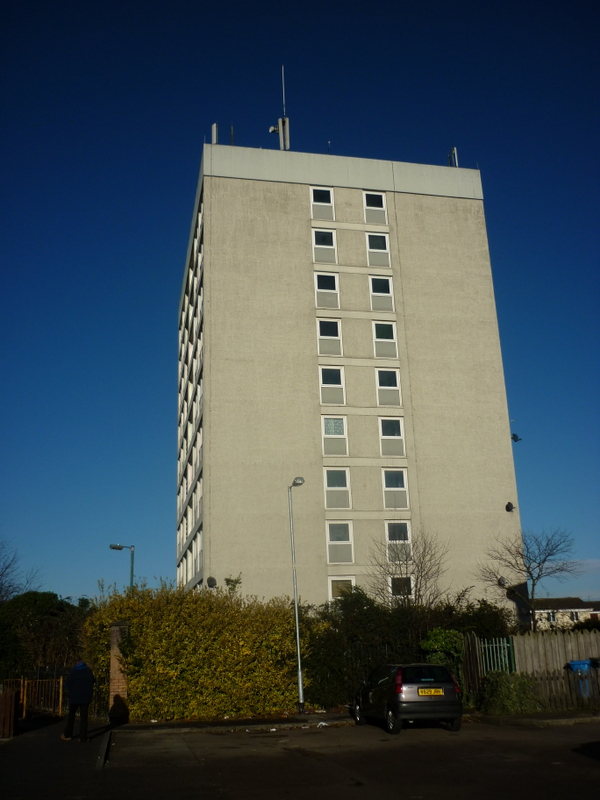
Gorthorpe flats (2012)

Construction of the Orchard Park Estate began in 1963. The estate, together with the Ings Road Estate in East Hull was built as a response to a need for more council housing stock, in part due to slum clearances of older housing stock.

The estate took the form of four 'villages' (Thorpe Park, (Note: 53.79008°N 0.37389°W, Thorpe Park (approximate centre)) Danepark, (Note: 53.78914°N 0.38735°W, Danepark (approximate centre)) Courtpark, (Note: 53.78418°N 0.38559°W, Court Park (approximate centre)) and Shaw Parks (Note: 53.78798°N 0.38289°W, Shaw Park (approximate centre))), each consisting of a housing plan inspired by the Radburn design, each with a central tower block of flats. (Shaw Park lacked tower blocks.) An extension of Hall Road curved through the estate connecting from the Endike Lane (to Cottingham) to Beverley Road (to Beverley); use was made of landscaping with minor hillocks of made ground, mostly along the west and north side of Hall Road.

The estate was built with school facilities as part of the development. These were Thorpe Park Primary & Junior (east end of Hall Road, near Thorpe Park Road); (Note: 53.78772°N 0.37182°W, Thorpe Park Primary) Court Park Primary & Junior (Courtway Road); (Note: 53.78451°N 0.38761°W, Court Park Primary, now The Parks Primary) Danepark Primary & Junior school (between Feldane & Ealdane, Dane Park Road); (Note: 53.79017°N 0.39091°W, Dane Park Primary (site of)) Shaw Park Primary & Junior (near Dringshaw, Orchard Park Road); (Note: 53.78863°N 0.38005°W, Shaw Park Primary (site of)) Sir Henry Cooper High (north-east corner of the estate, Thorpepark Road); (Note: 53.79292°N 0.37337°W, Sir Henry Cooper High (site of)) Sir Leo Schultz High (opposite Isledane, north side of Danepark Road). (Note: 53.79235°N 0.38468°W, Sir Leo Schultz High (site of)) Additionally there were Roman Catholic schools St John Fisher Junior High School; (Note: 53.78349°N 0.38956°W, St John Fisher High, now Police college) and Holy Name Primary, (Note: 53.78445°N 0.38921°W, Holy Name Primary) adjacent on the west side of Hall Road near the junction with Courtway Road.

Initial plans for an 'integrated neighbourhood centre' made in 1963 were abandoned by the council in 1969; subsequently in 1974 the Orchard Park shopping centre opened. (Note: 53.78832°N 0.37654°W, Orchard Park shopping centre)

Leo Schultz School closed 1986. St John Fisher school closed 1988; the school buildings and site were later used by Humberside Police as a training centre.

=== 2000–present ===
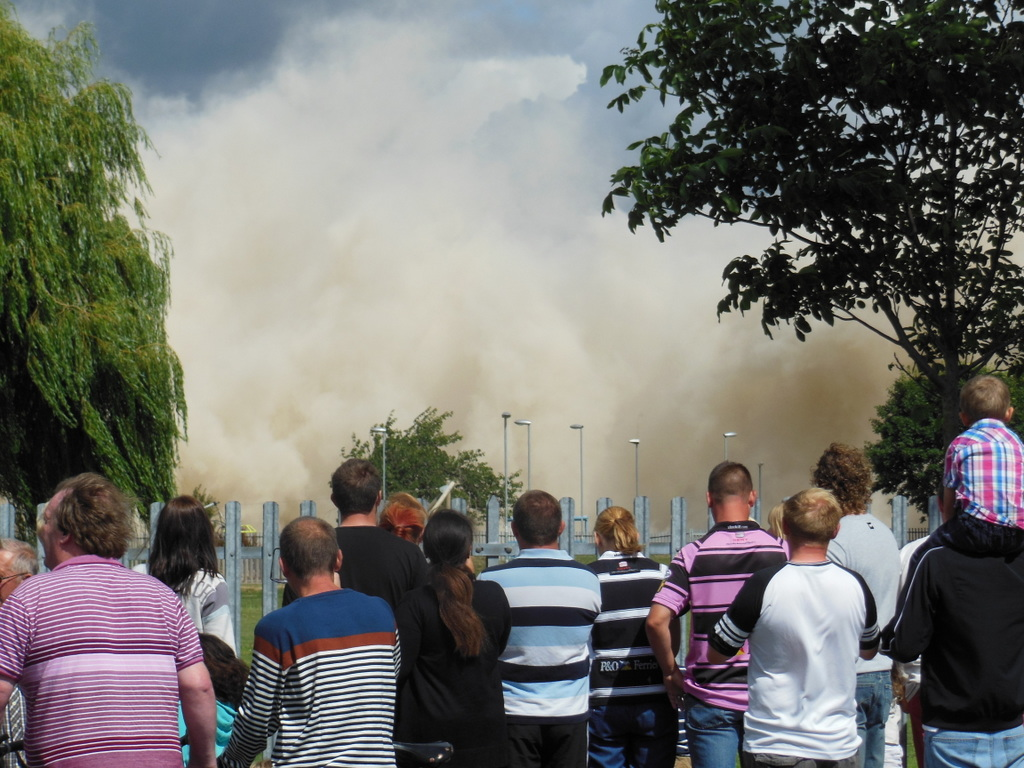
Crowns turned out watching the demolition of Ashthorpe flats

In 2001 the area had high levels of unoccupied housing at 26%.

Shaw Park Primary closed in 2001. Danepark Primary closed 2002. In 2002 the Parks Primary school (Courtway Road, Court Park School site) was formed from the merger of two primary schools. The development, named 'Harrison Park', is expected to be compete late 2016.

Two high-rise flats in the Danepark area (Milldane) were demolished in 2002. (Note: 53.78815°N 0.38731°W, Milldane flats (3 towers, site of)) Two of three high-rise flats in the Thorpe Park area (Homethorpe) were demolished in 2002 and 2004 (Drake House and Vernon House). (Note: 53.78881°N 0.37400°W, Homethorpe flats (3 towers, site of))

In 2003 the violent murder of Rachel Moran was carried out by Michael Little on the estate.

In the mid to late 2000s the council demolished parts of the estate at Feldane, Gildane, Hardane, and Isledane; reducing he housing density by approximately half, with some of the freed space converted to public space. A large health centre incorporating a pharmacy was constructed in the late 2000s, and opened in 2009. (Note: 53.787855°N 0.374229°W, Orchard Centre (health centre))

In 2008 Hull City Council approved a bid for Private Finance Initiative (PFI) funding to redevelop the estate; this was approved by Housing Minister John Healey in July 2009, with an allocation of £156 million. In 2010, the then Liberal controlled Hull City Council approved the demolition of all remaining high-rise tower blocks on the estate; with over 600 new homes planned to be built on the estate. The council's plans to demolish and rebuild housing using PFI funding were upset by cuts in government funding. with the government cancelling all housing PFI projects that were at the pipeline stage. Other PFI projects on the estate outside the project continued, including the "Extra Care" (residential care) project at Homethorpe. The demolition of high-rise and mid-sized flats on the estate was not affected.

Following control of the council passing to the Labour party the decision to demolish four of the blocks of flats was reviewed, with a report in 2012 recommending the demolition (Gorthorpe, (Note: 53.79020°N 0.37506°W, Gorthorpe flats (site of)) Kinthorpe, (Note: 53.78913°N 0.37213°W, Kinthorpe flats (site of)) Laxthorpe, (Note: 53.78840°N 0.37194°W, Laxthorpe flats (site of)) and Highcourt (Note: 53.78359°N 0.38626°W, Highcourt flats (site of))). In mid 2012 the council decided to refurbish two of the blocks (Gorthorpe, and Kinthorpe) owing to demand for housing and demolish the others.

Sir Henry Cooper High School was closed in 2012, with most pupils and teachers transferring to Thomas Ferens Academy (now known as Sirius Academy North). The Parks Primary school closed 2013, re-opening as The Parks Primary Academy in late 2013. Holy Name primary school was renamed St Anthony's Primary in 2013 after the closure of the nearby Holy Name church. The structure of Holy Name church was incorporated into a care home facility in the early 2010s.

The 22-storey Bridgeman House (Homethorpe) was demolished in 2012. The 22-storey Ashthorpe, (Note: 53.78958°N 0.37953°W, Ashthorpe flats (site of)) and Milldane tower blocks, were demolished in 2013.

In 2013 the city council approved funding for improvements to the housing stock: the main activity was to be energy efficiency improvements to the 1,195 low rise houses of the Wimpey no-fines house type; specifically insulative cladding.

The Highcourt tower block was scheduled for demolition in 2014, having had its tenancy reduced to only four people; the demolition was completed in March 2015.

In March 2014 agreement was reached on work to construct a 52-house new-build housing development on the site of the Bridgeman house tower block. The main contractor for the £5 million project was Wates Living Space (Wates Group), acting for the developer, Riverside Group. An 'Extra Care' facility with 65 residential places as well as community care facilities was to be built adjacent, also by Riverside. In May 2014 the council decided to demolish the Gorthorpe and Kinthorpe flats which had previously been spared demolition and were planned to be refurbished. In 2014 demolition work for construction of a new shopping centre for the estate began; the development was delayed several years to the difficulty of finding an 'anchor' shopholder for the development, and due to funding difficulties. Demolition of the Kinthorpe and Laxthorpe flats began September 2014 by mechanical demolition. Demolition of the Gorthorpe flats was delayed due to previous contractual arrangements to provide a site for mobile phone masts. In mid 2016 a new location for the phone masts was found (St Michael and All Angel Church) allowing demolition of the tower block.

As significant redevelopment was taking place in the 2010s the city council investigated the viability of installing district heating into properties in the area – a report by Ramboll published 2014 concluded such as scheme (costing £29.6 million) would not be commercially viable, with a low rate of return of 2.7%.

In 2015 planning permission was granted for 178 new homes in the Danepark area, on a site including the former Milldane tower block. (Construction began late 2016.) In 2016 Willmott Dixon was awarded a multi-million contract to improve energy efficiency of Hull City Council's housing stock, with measures including the installation of external insulation – 1,668 houses in Orchard Park were to be treated, with work scheduled to start March 2016. The 'Wimpey no-fines' houses in the Thorpes, Danes and Courts were to receive cladding.

In 2016 the site of the former Henry Cooper school was re-purposed as a 'community park' with some of the former school's sports courts being re-used. The site was renamed "Sir Henry Cooper Park".

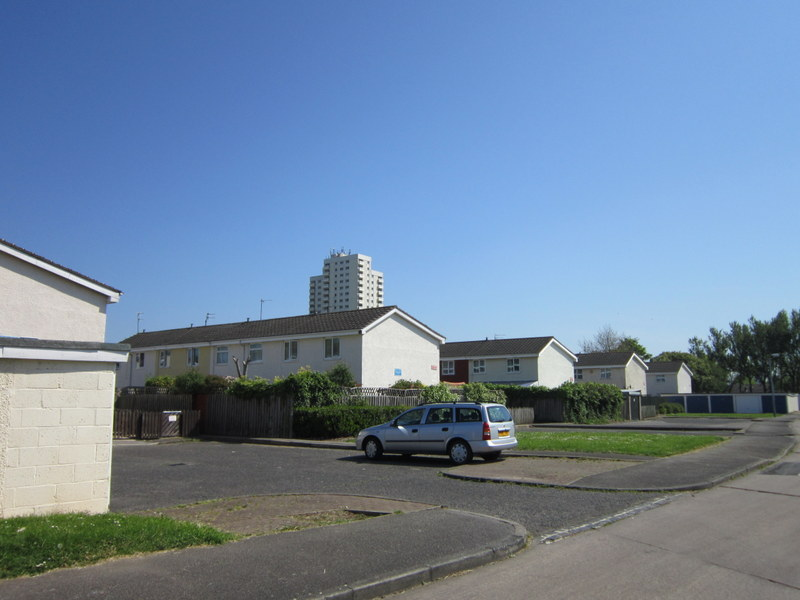
Bondane, Danepark (2012)

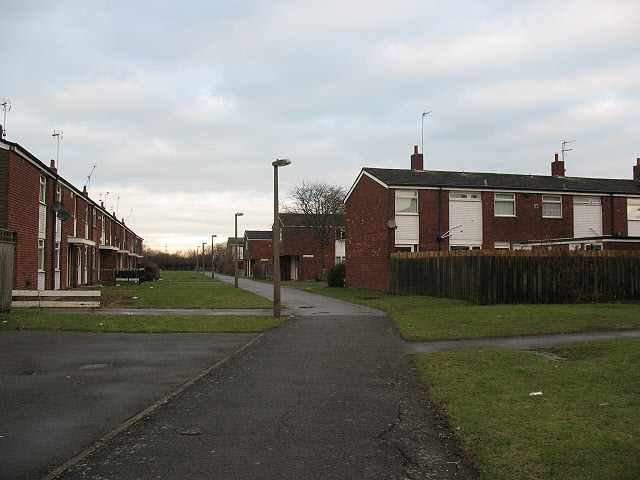
Clanthorpe, Thorpepark (2011)

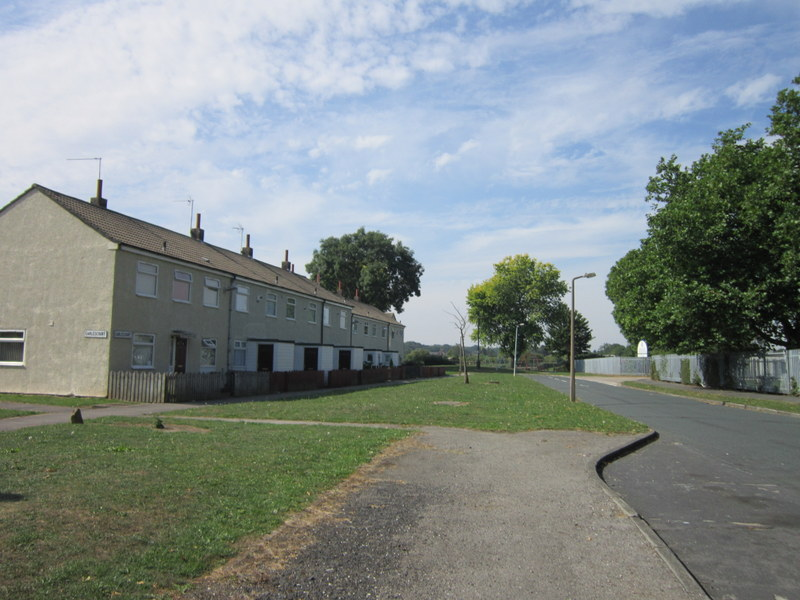
Earlescourt, Court Park (2013)

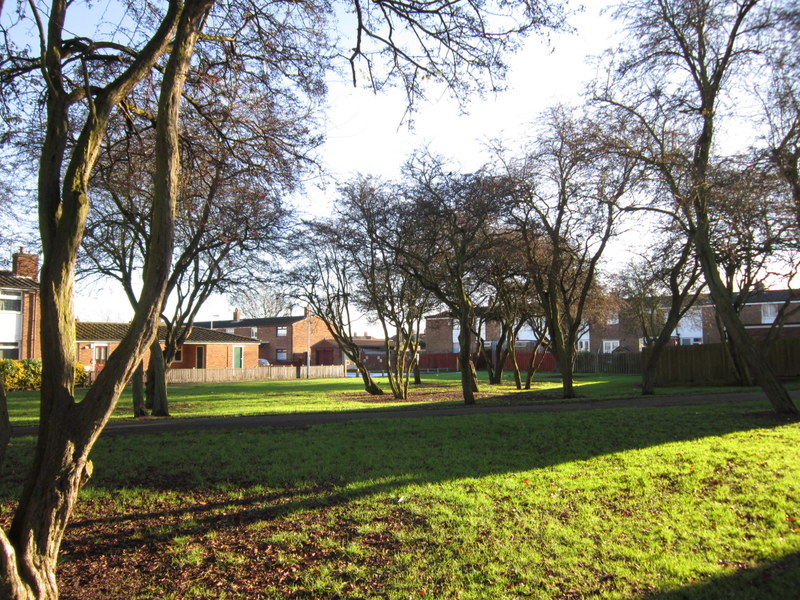
Cladshaw, Shaw Park (2012)

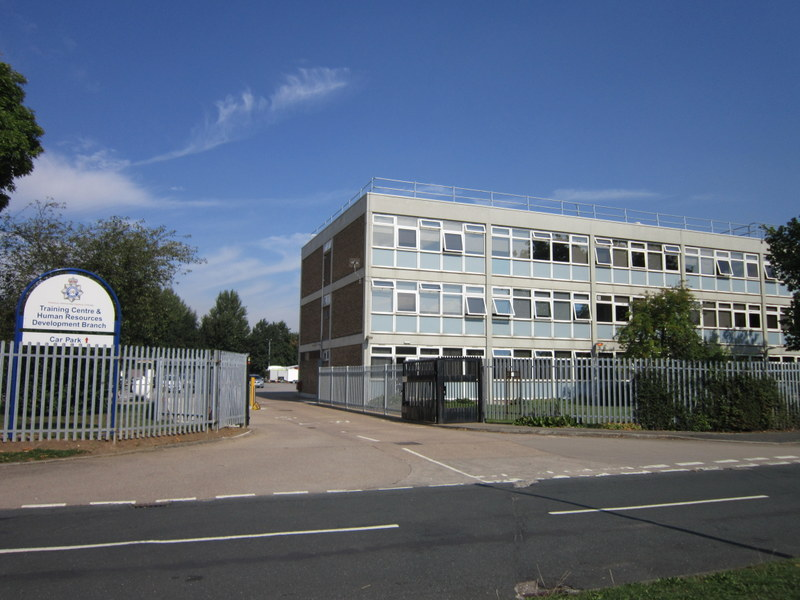
Police college, formerly St John Fisher (RC) school (2013)

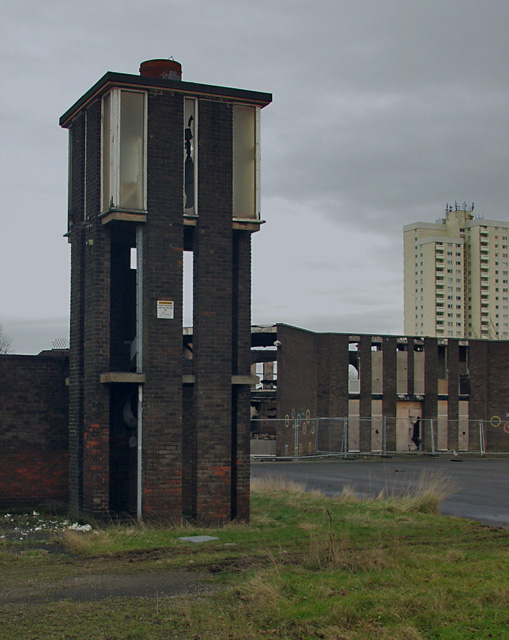
Burnt out remains of Dane Park Junior (2008)

== See also ==
- List of areas in Kingston upon Hull
- List of large council estates in the UK
