= Malet Lambert (priest) =

Reverend Joseph Malet Lambert
- Born: 1853
- Died: 1931
- Known for: public service, child abuse
- Spouse: Rose Lambert

Joseph Malet Lambert (1853–1931) was an English Anglican priest, vicar of St. John's parish, Hull, later Dean of Hull, Canon of York, and Archdeacon of the East Riding within the Church of England.

He was active in social reform and the municipal affairs of Hull, including housing, sanitation and education, yet allowed a child in his care to be beaten and neglected to such a point that the child was taken into care.

== Biography ==
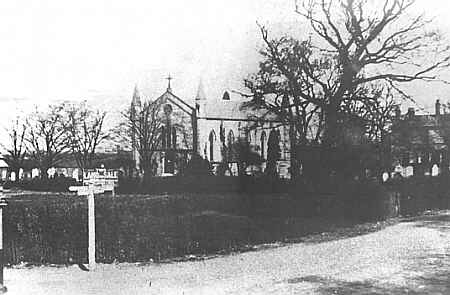
St. John's Church, Hull (1890)

Malet Lambert was born in Hull in 1853, the son of Joseph Lambert and his second wife, Jane Hudson Malet, of Cork. His mother died when he was young. When he was 11 years old, his father remarried to Rachel Wilson, the daughter of Thomas Wilson, a Hull shipping-line owner. He attended Pocklington Grammar School and later entered his father's ship-broking business in the High Street.

Eventually he entered Trinity College, Dublin, graduating with a first rank honors BA in Natural Science 1879. In that same year he was ordained, becoming curate at Tadcaster.

In 1881 he became vicar of Newland, Hull, a position he held for the next three decades. Soon after he was instrumental in creating the parish of St. Augustine's, serving the recently built area of The Avenues, (Note: Formally opened 1875, mostly built upon by 1910. See The Avenues, Hull for development chronology.) and other new urban developments; the district was taken out of his own parish. During his encumbancy the church was expanded with the addition of a chancel (1893), and a north aisle (1902), as well as having the vaults filled in, the nave extended, and other alterations.

In February 1882 he married Miss Rose Harrison, eldest daughter of Arthur Harrison of Northgate House, Cottingham. He received an M.A. in 1883, Bachelor of Laws in 1884 and Doctor of Laws in 1885.

In the 1880s Malet Lambert was involved in the 'Hull Sanitary Association', a body set up to improve sewage, refuse, and disease treatment in Hull, and was instrumental in instigated an investigation into the housing conditions of the poor. He also became involved in, a member of the Hull School Board, later becoming its chairman.

In 1894 Malet Lambert became Rural dean of Hull. In 1900 he became Canon of York and in 1917, Archdeacon of the East Riding.

In the early years the beginning of the 20th century, Lambert and his wife were charged with cruelty and neglect of a ten-year-old female child in their care. The child, who had been taken in to be trained as a servant, was presented to a visiting doctor by concerned servants of the house - the child was ascertained to be malnourished by a doctor, weighing 48 lb (22 kg) aged 11. In addition to the malnutrition of the child she was said to have been keep secret from visitors by Mrs. Lambert, beaten with a stick and poker by Mrs. Lambert, who had instructed her cook to do the same. The contradictions of the Lambert's treatment of their charge, and Malet Lambert's so-called philanthropic work were noted at the trial, as was the differences in well being of the child and the Lambert's own offspring. The child was taken into the care of a workhouse, where she made a rapid recovery.

In 1927 Lambert became the first chairman of the council of the newly established University College (Hull) (see Hull University). Lambert died 17 April 1931.

=== Positions held ===
- Vicar of St John's Church, Newland (1881–1912)
- Canon of York (1900–1931)
- Archdeacon of the East Riding (1917–1931)
- First Chairman of the Council of Hull University College (1927–1931)
- Chairman of Hull Higher Education Committee (1905–1931)

=== Published works ===
- Lambert, Joseph Malet (1890), Gambling: is it wrong?, Simpkin, Marshall, Hamilton, Kent & Company
- Lambert, J. Malet (1891), Two thousand years of gild life; or, An outline of the history and development of the gild system from early times : with special reference to its application to trade and industry; together with a full account of the gilds and trading companies of Kingston-upon-Hull, from the 14th to the 18th century, A. Brown & Sons. Reprinted BiblioBazaar (2009), ISBN 1113673559, "work describing the development of the guild system in England, with particular reference to Hull from the 14th to 18th century."

== See also ==
- Malet Lambert School
