= Eva Crackles =

British botanist and teacher (1918–2007)

- Dr Crackles
- Born: Florence Eva Crackles; 23 January 1918; Hull, England
- Died: 14 July 2007 (aged 89)
- Occupations: botanist; teacher
- Awards: MBE (1992)
- Scientific career
- Fields: Botany
- Workplaces: University of Hull
- Doctoral advisor: Ronald Good

Eva Crackles MBE FLS (1918–2007) was a British botanist and teacher notable for her major contributions to the Atlas of the British Flora, published in 1962.

She began teaching in 1941. As a teacher she was Head of Biology at Hull's Malet Lambert School for many years, until 1978. She also taught evening classes for the Workers' Educational Association.

Crackles became a recorder for the Botanical Society of Britain and Ireland in the 1950s, allowing her to contribute to the Atlas of the British Flora.

== Recognition ==
Crackles received an honorary Doctor of Science degree from the University of Hull in 1991, for her work on grasses of the genus Calamagrostis.

In 1966, Crackles became a fellow of the Linnean Society of London.

In 1992, Crackles was made a Member of the Order of the British Empire (MBE) by Queen Elizabeth II for her work in plant conservation. She was elected Honorary Life member of the Botanical Society of Britain and Ireland in 2000.

== Works ==
- The Flowering Plants of Spurn. Hull Academic Press. 1986. ASIN B0007BMORO.
- Flora of the East Riding of Yorkshire. Hull Academic Press. 1990. ISBN 978-0859584876.
