= Sirius Academy West =

Location
- 296 Anlaby Park Road South; Hull, East Riding of Yorkshire, HU4 7JB; England; 53.7345°N 0.4105°W

Information
- Type: Academy
- Established: 1895 as The Boulevard; 1940 as Kingston High School; 2001 as Pickering High School; 2009 as Sirius Academy; 2015 as Sirius Academy West
- Local authority: Hull
- Department for Education URN: 135945 Tables
- Ofsted: Reports
- Principal: Cathy Taylor
- Age: 11 to 18
- Enrolment: 995
- Website: http://www.sirius-academy.org.uk/

Sirius Academy West (formerly Sirius Academy, Pickering High School, Kingston High School and The Boulevard) is a secondary school in Hull, England. It was renamed Sirius Academy in September 2009 under Building Schools for the Future, with Sports College specialist status.

== History ==
The last headteacher of Pickering High School was Elaine Wadsworth, who was replaced by a principal, Cathy Taylor, when the school became an academy.

In September 2011 the school moved into a new £48.5 million building which replaced an older one, bringing the school within one site, with a new sports hall to support sports college status.

The school's GCSE results have improved over the years.

After becoming an academy the school was originally known as Sirius Academy. However, in 2015 Thomas Ferens Academy joined the Sirius Academy Multi Academy Trust and was renamed Sirius Academy North. Sirius Academy was renamed Sirius Academy West to distinguish the two institutions.

== Facilities ==
School facilities include an all-weather pitch, sports hall, sports lab, hair and beauty salon, industrial quality food technology rooms, dance studio, construction bays and an eco-dome.

== Ofsted ==
The 2003 Ofsted inspection rated the school as Grade 2 "Good", highlighting strengths, and improvements to be made.

Strengths:

- Very good leadership and management by the headteacher and managerial teaching staff
- Good teaching in lessons resulting in good learning and positive relationships
- Provisions made for special education needs (SEN) pupils
- Systems for monitoring pupil progression

Improvements were suggested in:

- Teaching, particularly in mathematics
- The greater use of ICT to assist learning
- Attendance and punctuality
- The modernising of teaching and recreational areas to improve learning and safety

In March 2014 an Ofsted inspection rated the school as "Outstanding" in all areas.

In May 2022 an Ofsted inspection rated the school as "Good". However, it noted that behaviour and attitudes requires improvement.

== Former pupils ==
=== Kingston High School ===
- John Alderton
- Tom Courtenay
- Amy Johnson
- Alan Plater
