= North Hull Estate =

Area of Kingston upon Hull, East Riding of Yorkshire, England

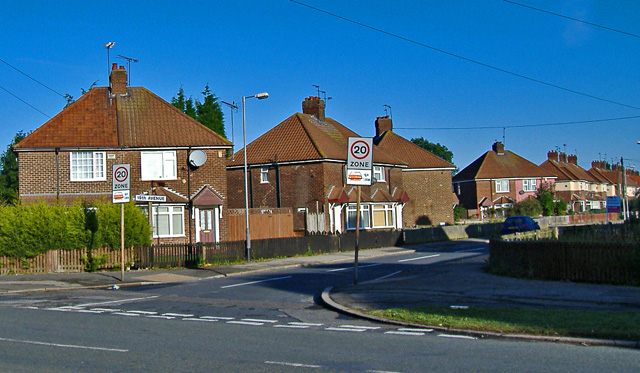
Typical 1930s housing, 19th Avenue, Endike Lane (2007)

The North Hull Estate is a residential area in the north of Kingston upon Hull, west of the River Hull, built by Hull Corporation in the interwar period.

The area includes a wide area of housing including The Quadrant, the Endike Lane area, and the North Hull estate proper, north of Endike Lane.

== History ==
Before the establishment of the estate, the area was enclosed farmland. The east–west Cottingham Road (Cottingham branch of the Hull and Beverley Trust, former turnpike), Inglemire Lane, Endike Lane, and North Carr Lane (later Orchard Park Road) were already in existence and date to before the 19th century. In addition to agriculture a number of clay extraction was taking place at a number of sites in the area for brick and tile manufacture during the latter part of the 19th century; these were inactive by the early 20th century. A farm Igglemire or Inglemire farm was located approximately half way along Inglemire Lane.

In the 1920s the city of Kingston upon Hull had a substantial shortage of housing stock due to lack of house building during the First World War, and the need to replace substandard and slum housing; in 1925 an inspector of health estimated a shortage of around 9,000 houses. The corporation undertook a large scale house building programme in the 1920s and 1930s, concentrated at three locations: in west Hull (Willerby Road/Priory Road area); in east Hull (east of Marfleet Lane); and in Northwest Hull, north of Endike Lane. The latter was to become the North Hull Estate.

The earliest of the developments, built within the terms of the Housing, Town Planning, &c. Act 1919 was The Quadrant estate, and consisted of short terraces and semi detached housing in brick, with short front and longer back gardens. The estate was centred on a circular road, named The Quadrant, (Note: 53.77396°N 0.37962°W, The Quadrant) with streets (named after East Riding villages) branching off. A church St Alban was constructed in 1938 on the west side of the estate, (Hall Road), replacing a temporary church of 1929 which was reused as the parish Hall. The main church was reconstructed in 1955/6 due to subsidence. (Note: 53.77298°N 0.38393°W, St Alban's church and Hall)

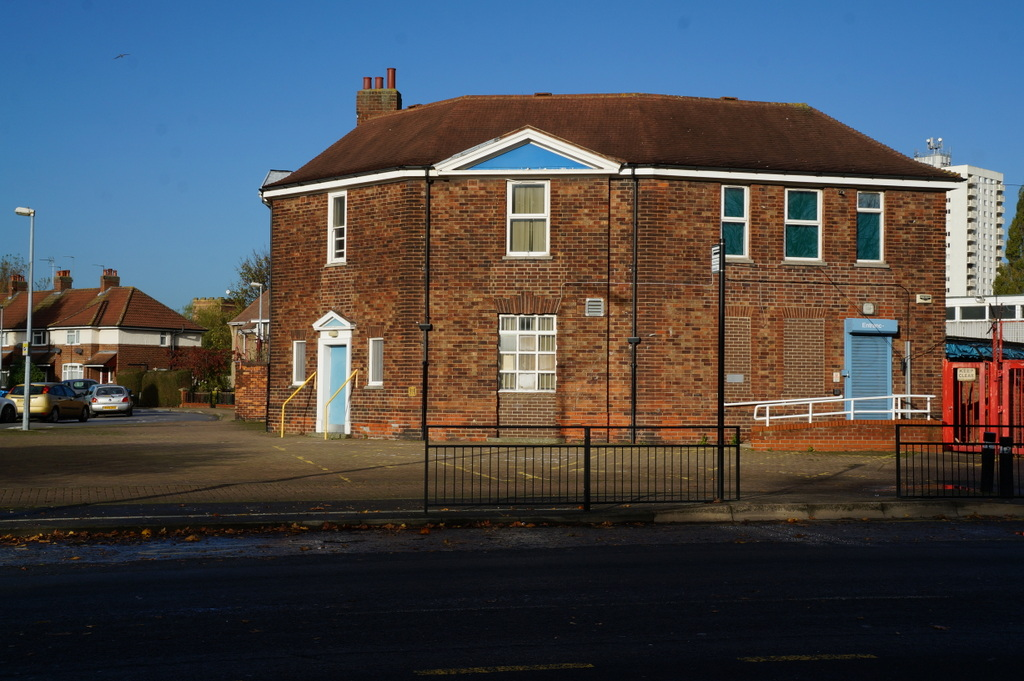
Former Greenwood Avenue rent office (2013)

Later developments were built under the Housing Act 1930 (20 & 21 Geo. 5. c. 39), such as the North Hull Estate north of Endike Lane, (Note: 53.78221°N 0.37137°W, North Hull Estate (approximate centre)) which were built along Garden Village principles, with wider tree lined roads, greater communal facilities, and more detailing on the housing architecture. Hall Road was built during the 1930s phase, along with housing between Inglemire Lane and Endike Lane, and to the north of Endike Lane. The 'Garden Village' development north of Endike Lane had streets predominantly named numerically, e.g. 29th Avenue, 33rd Avenue, etc. A main road, Greenwood Avenue was built connecting Ingemire Lane to Beverley Road, curving north-east to east.

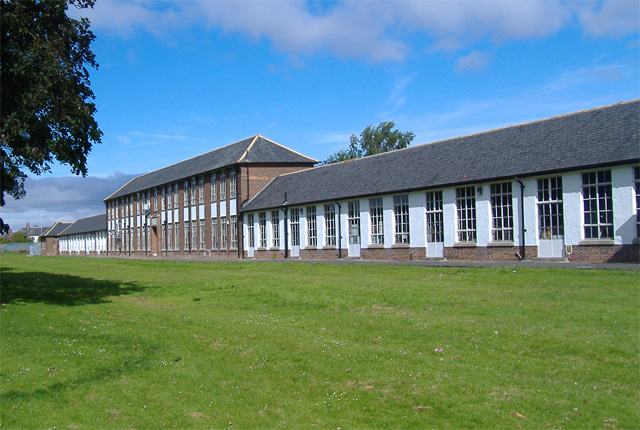
Endike Primary School, 1930s, demolished c. 2012 (2007)

The development also included schools built within the estate, including Endike Lane Primary, (Note: 53.77940°N 0.36038°W, Endike Lane Primary (site of)) Fifth Avenue School (formerly Endike Lane West), (Note: 53.78073°N 0.37126°W, Fifth Avenue School (site of)) and Hall Road school. (Note: 53.77294°N 0.38171°W, Hall Road School (site of)) Much of the land between Endike Lane and Inglemire Lane was undeveloped, and was utilised as playing fields. A primary school "Twenty First Avenue" was established adjacent to Fifth Avenue School in the mid-1930s.

A temporary church was built c. 1934 on the northern fringe of the estate, replaced by a permanent building c. 1955–57 (St Michael and All Angels). (Note: 53.78757°N 0.37575°W, St Michael and All Angels church) A Roman Catholic church Holy Name was also built on the north-western outskirts of the estate c. 1933. (Note: 53.78179°N 0.38623°W, Holy Name church)

In the post war period some infill development took place creating Riccall and Skipwith Groves, on two small former undeveloped spaces (one an allotment) within the estate. From 1963 onwards the Orchard Park Estate was built to the north and west of the North Hull Estate. 21st Avenue School closed 1969, and Fifth Avenue School closed 1985.

In the 1990s the North Hull Estate was the first established Housing Action Trust (HAT), which was involved in the refurbishment and improvement of around 2,000 properties.

Fifth Avenue Primary was rebuilt and renamed Greenway Primary school c. 2008. A new school Thomas Ferens Academy, (Note: 53.78638°N 0.36579°W, Thomas Ferens Academy) (now named Sirius Academy North) opened in 2012, built at a cost of £24.5 million with places for 1,250 11- to 16-year-olds. Endike Primary was replaced with a new school c. 2012, built at a cost of £6 million. Both Endike and Thomas Ferens were developed as part of Hull's Building Schools for the Future programme. Hall Road School became Hall Road Primary Academy in 2012.

Holy Name (RC) church closed and the site was redeveloped as a care home, opening 2012.

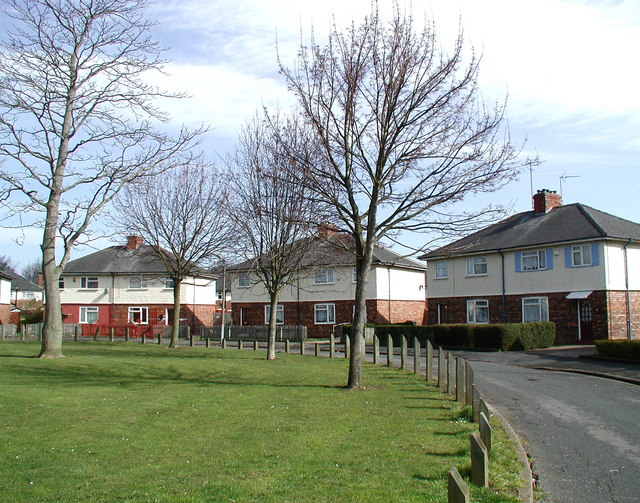
Marton Grove, inner circular road, The Quadrant (2008)

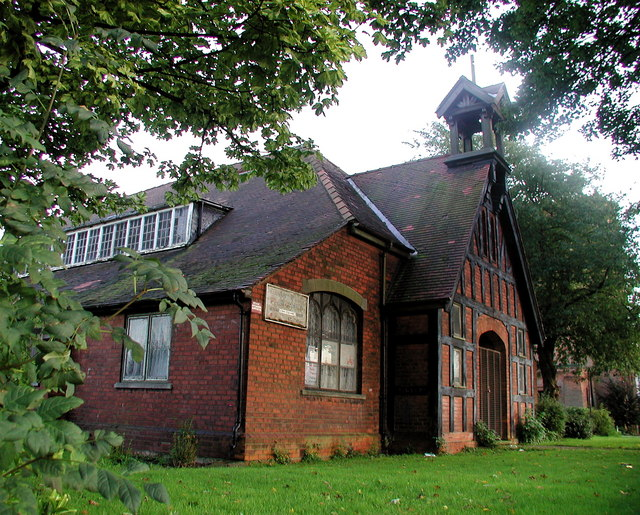
St Alban's church, 1938 (2006)

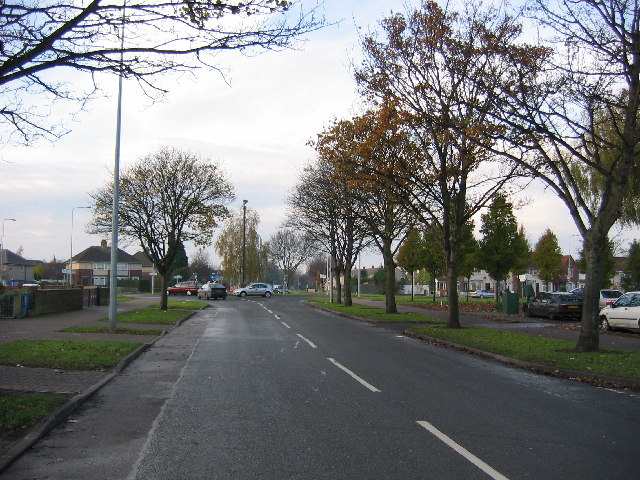
Endike Lane (2005)

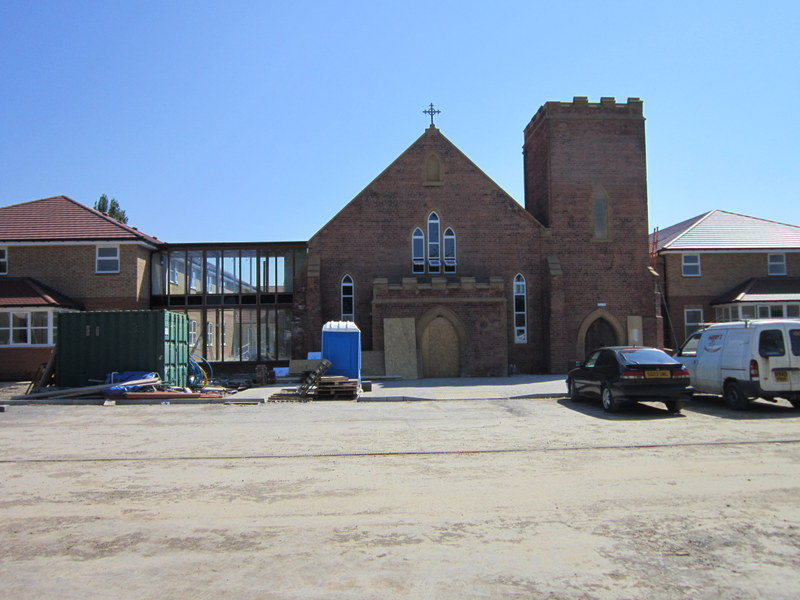
Holy Name church under conversion to care home (2012)

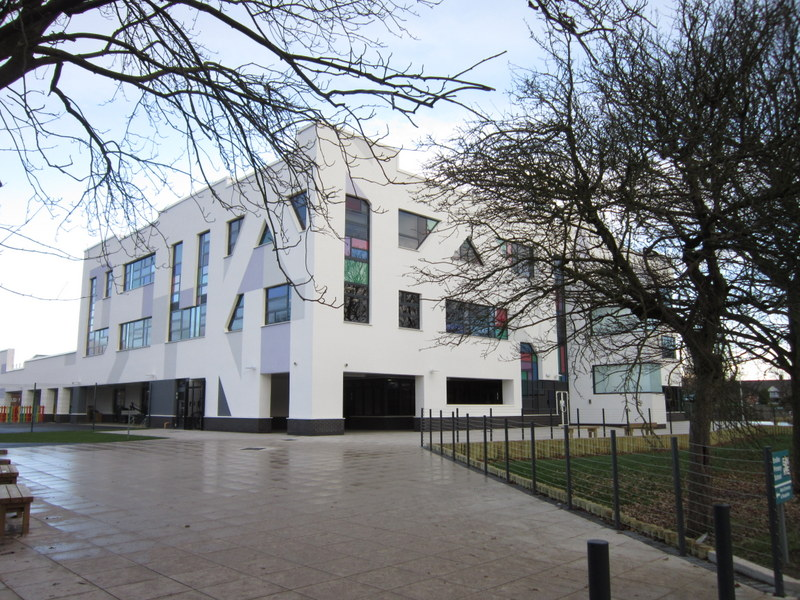
Endike Primary School (2012)

== People ==
- Josh Tymon, footballer
