= The Aces (rock and roll band) =

British rock and roll band

The Aces are a long-standing English rock and roll band from Hull. In the 1960s they released singles in the UK and U.S.

== Early work ==
The Aces began playing in Hull during the British skiffle boom of the late 1950s. The line-up changed a few times, but stabilised with a quartet comprising Eric Lee (vocals), brothers Brian Gatie (guitar) and Adrian Gatie (drums), and Johnny Pat on bass. They were signed to Parlophone during the beat boom era.

== The 1960s ==
They released two UK singles with Parlophone: "Wait Till Tomorrow" in December 1963 (with the B-side being "The Last One") and "I Count the Tears", a cover of The Drifters hit, in February 1964 (the B-side being "But Say It Isn't So"). In the United States "I Count the Tears" was released as "Counting Tears" on the Stellar label in August 1964. Bassist and unofficial frontman Johnny Pat also played with another Hull band, The Small Four, who were signed to Pye Records and supported Jimi Hendrix.

== Later work and charity fundraising ==
The Aces continue to perform regularly and have now been in showbusiness for well over fifty years. In the Queen's 2017 Birthday Honours Johnny Pat was awarded the British Empire Medal (BEM) for services to charity fundraising and the community in Hull and East Riding of Yorkshire.

== Singles ==
=== United Kingdom ===
- "Wait Till Tomorrow" (Parlophone) December 1963 (B-side: "The Last One")
- "I Count the Tears" (Parlophone) February 1964 (B-side: But Say It Isn't So")

=== United States ===
- "Counting Tears" (Stellar) August 1964 (B-side: "But Say It Isn't So")
