= Sirius Academy North =

Coordinates: 53.7863°N 0.3658°W

Location
- 540 Hall Road; North Hull Estate; Kingston upon Hull, East Riding of Yorkshire, HU6 9BP; England

Information
- Type: Academy
- Established: 1 September 2012
- Local authority: Hull City Council
- Department for Education URN: 138246 Tables
- Ofsted: Reports
- Gender: Mixed
- Age: 11 to 16
- Website: http://www.siriusacademynorth.org.uk/

Sirius Academy North (formerly Thomas Ferens Academy) is a mixed secondary school located in the North Hull Estate of Kingston upon Hull in the East Riding of Yorkshire, England. The school was originally named after Thomas Ferens, the Liberal Member of Parliament for Hull East from 1906 to 1918.

The school was established in 2012 as part of the Building Schools for the Future programme. The school largely replaced Sir Henry Cooper School which closed the same year. As an academy, the school was sponsored by the University of Hull, Hull City Council, Wilberforce College and Wyke College.

In July 2015, after almost a year in special measures, it was announced that Thomas Ferens Academy was to become Sirius Academy North and be part of the Sirius Academy Multi Academy Trust (SAMAT), therefore being a "sister" school of the former Sirius Academy - now Sirius Academy West - which was rated outstanding by Ofsted.
