= Kingston upon Hull North =

UK Parliament constituency (1950–1974, 1983–2024)

- Former borough constituency for the House of Commons
- 2010–2024 boundary of Kingston upon Hull North in the former county of Humberside

- Location of the former county of Humberside within England
- County: East Riding of Yorkshire (1950–1974, 1996–2024); Humberside (1983–1996)
- Electorate: 62,917 (December 2019)

1983–2024
- Seats: One
- Created from: Kingston upon Hull Central; Kingston upon Hull East
- Replaced by: Kingston upon Hull North and Cottingham; Kingston upon Hull East (minor part)

1950–1974
- Seats: One
- Type of constituency: Borough constituency
- Created from: Kingston upon Hull North West; Kingston upon Hull Central
- Replaced by: Kingston upon Hull Central

Kingston upon Hull North was a borough constituency for the House of Commons of the Parliament of the United Kingdom. It elected one Member of Parliament (MP) at least once every five years by the first-past-the-post electoral system.

Further to the completion of the 2023 Periodic Review of Westminster constituencies, the seat was abolished. Subject to boundary changes including the addition of the community of Cottingham, as a consequence, it was replaced by Kingston upon Hull North and Cottingham, first contested in the 2024 general election.

== Boundaries ==
Map of boundaries 2010-2024

1950–1955: The County Borough of Hull wards of Beverley, Newland, Park, and University.

1955–1974: The County Borough of Hull wards of Beverley, Botanic, Newland, Paragon, Park, University, and West Central.

1983–2010: The City of Hull wards of Avenue, Beverley, Newland, Noddle Hill, Orchard Park, Stoneferry, and University.

2010–2024: The City of Hull wards of Avenue, Beverley, Bransholme East, Bransholme West, Bricknell, Kings Park, Newland, Orchard Park and Greenwood, and University.

== Constituency profile ==
This constituency covered the northern part of Hull. A diverse constituency: in west Hull it included the large working class housing estates of North Hull Estate and Orchard Park Estate, as well as the Newland, The Avenues, Newland Park and Beverley High Road areas. The University of Hull is located in the Newland area of the constituency and the Beverley Road and Newland areas have large student populations. The constituency extended east of the River Hull including the Bransholme housing estate, and the developing (2010s) housing estate of Kingswood.

== Members of Parliament ==
=== MPs 1950–1974 ===
Election	Member	Party
1950	Austen Hudson	Conservative
1959	Michael Coulson	Conservative
1964	Henry Solomons	Labour
1966 by-election	Kevin McNamara	Labour
Feb 1974	Constituency abolished (McNamara became MP for Kingston upon Hull Central)	

=== MPs 1983–2024 ===
Election	Member	Party
1983	Kevin McNamara	Labour
2005	Diana Johnson	Labour
2024	Constituency abolished	

== Election results 1983–2024 ==
=== Elections in the 1980s ===
1983 general election: Kingston upon Hull North
Party	Candidate	Votes	%	±%
Labour	Kevin McNamara	21,365	42.5	
Conservative	Christopher Hayward	15,337	30.5	
SDP	Terence Smith	13,381	26.6	
Nationalist Party	Robert Tenney	222	0.4	
Majority		6,028	12.0	
Turnout		50,301	67.5	
Labour win (new seat)				

1987 general election: Kingston upon Hull North
Party	Candidate	Votes	%	±%
Labour	Kevin McNamara	26,123	51.2	+8.7
Conservative	Ann O'Brien	13,954	27.3	−3.1
SDP	Stephen Unwin	10,962	21.5	−5.1
Majority		12,169	23.9	+11.9
Turnout		51,039	69.6	+2.1
Labour hold		Swing	+5.9	

=== Elections in the 1990s ===
1992 general election: Kingston upon Hull North
Party	Candidate	Votes	%	±%
Labour	Kevin McNamara	26,619	55.9	+4.7
Conservative	B. G. Coleman	11,235	23.6	−3.7
Liberal Democrats	Andrew Meadowcroft	9,504	20.0	−1.5
Natural Law	G. P. Richardson	254	0.5	New
Majority		15,384	32.3	+8.4
Turnout		47,612	66.7	−2.9
Labour hold		Swing	+4.2	

1997 general election: Kingston upon Hull North
Party	Candidate	Votes	%	±%
Labour	Kevin McNamara	25,542	65.8	+9.9
Conservative	David Lee	5,837	15.1	−3.5
Liberal Democrats	David Nolan	5,667	14.6	−5.4
Referendum	Norman Scott	1,533	4.0	New
Natural Law	Terry Brotheridge	215	0.6	+0.1
Majority		19,705	50.7	+18.4
Turnout		38,794	57.0	−9.7
Labour hold		Swing	+6.7	

=== Elections in the 2000s ===
2001 general election: Kingston upon Hull North
Party	Candidate	Votes	%	±%
Labour	Kevin McNamara	16,364	57.2	−8.6
Liberal Democrats	Simone Butterworth	5,643	19.7	+5.1
Conservative	Paul Charlson	4,902	17.1	+2.0
UKIP	Tineka Robinson	655	2.3	New
Socialist Alliance	Roger Smith	490	1.7	New
Legalise Cannabis	Paul Wagner	478	1.7	New
Independent	Christopher Veasey	101	0.4	New
Majority		10,721	37.5	−13.2
Turnout		28,633	45.5	−11.5
Labour hold		Swing		

2005 general election: Kingston upon Hull North
Party	Candidate	Votes	%	±%
Labour	Diana Johnson	15,364	51.9	−5.3
Liberal Democrats	Denis Healy	8,013	27.1	+7.4
Conservative	Lydia Rivlin	3,822	12.9	−4.2
Green	Martin Deane	858	2.9	New
BNP	Brian Wainwright	766	2.6	New
Veritas	Tineke Robinson	389	1.3	New
Northern Progress	Chris Veasey	193	0.7	New
Legalise Cannabis	Carl Wagner	179	0.6	−1.1
Majority		7,351	24.8	−12.7
Turnout		29,584	47.3	+1.8
Labour hold		Swing	−6.4	

=== Elections in the 2010s ===
2010 general election: Kingston upon Hull North
Party	Candidate	Votes	%	±%
Labour	Diana Johnson	13,044	39.2	−12.7
Liberal Democrats	Denis Healy	12,403	37.3	+10.2
Conservative	Victoria Aitken	4,365	13.1	+0.2
BNP	John Mainprize	1,443	4.3	+1.7
UKIP	Paul Barlow	1,358	4.1	New
Green	Martin Deane	478	1.4	−1.5
English Democrat	Michael Cassidy	200	0.6	New
Majority		641	1.9	−22.9
Turnout		33,291	52.0	+4.7
Registered electors		64,082		
Labour hold		Swing	−11.5	

2015 general election: Kingston upon Hull North
Party	Candidate	Votes	%	±%
Labour	Diana Johnson	18,661	52.8	+13.6
UKIP	Sergi Singh	5,762	16.3	+12.2
Conservative	Dehenna Davison	5,306	15.0	+1.9
Liberal Democrats	Mike Ross	3,175	9.0	−28.3
Green	Martin Deane	2,066	5.8	+4.4
Yorkshire First	Vicky Butler	366	1.0	New
Majority		12,899	36.5	+34.6
Turnout		35,336	55.1	+3.1
Registered electors		64,148		
Labour hold		Swing	+0.7	

2017 general election: Kingston upon Hull North
Party	Candidate	Votes	%	±%
Labour	Diana Johnson	23,685	63.8	+11.0
Conservative	Lia Nici-Townend	9,363	25.2	+10.2
Liberal Democrats	Mike Ross	1,869	5.0	−4.0
UKIP	John Kitchener	1,601	4.3	−12.0
Green	Martin Deane	604	1.6	−4.2
Majority		14,322	38.6	+2.1
Turnout		37,122	57.4	+2.3
Registered electors		64,665		
Labour hold		Swing	+0.4	

2019 general election: Kingston upon Hull North
Party	Candidate	Votes	%	±%
Labour	Diana Johnson	17,033	49.8	−14.0
Conservative	Holly Whitbread	9,440	27.6	+2.4
Brexit Party	Derek Abram	4,771	13.9	New
Liberal Democrats	Mike Ross	2,084	6.1	+1.1
Green	Richard Howarth	875	2.6	+1.0
Majority		7,593	22.2	−16.4
Turnout		34,203	52.2	−5.2
Registered electors		65,515		
Labour hold		Swing	−8.2	

== Elections 1950–1970 ==
=== Elections in the 1950s ===
1950 general election: Kingston upon Hull North
Party	Candidate	Votes	%	±%
Conservative	Austen Hudson	18,811	44.66	
Labour	C. F. C. Lawson	18,041	42.83	
Liberal	George Stanley Atkinson	5,268	12.51	
Majority		770	1.83	
Turnout		42,120	86.30	
Conservative win (new seat)				

1951 general election: Kingston upon Hull North
Party	Candidate	Votes	%	±%
Conservative	Austen Hudson	22,545	52.96	+8.3
Labour	John Foord	20,025	47.04	+4.21
Majority		2,520	5.92	
Turnout		42,570	84.70	
Conservative hold		Swing		

1955 general election: Kingston upon Hull North
Party	Candidate	Votes	%	±%
Conservative	Austen Hudson	25,780	50.58	−2.38
Labour	John Foord	25,190	49.42	+2.38
Majority		590	1.16	−4.76
Turnout		50,970	77.37	−7.33
Conservative hold		Swing		

1959 general election: Kingston upon Hull North
Party	Candidate	Votes	%	±%
Conservative	Michael Coulson	23,612	45.30	−5.28
Labour	Jack Foord	22,910	43.95	−5.47
Liberal	Antony Butcher	5,604	10.75	New
Majority		702	1.35	+0.19
Turnout		52,126	81.55	+4.18
Conservative hold		Swing		

=== Elections in the 1960s ===
1964 general election: Kingston upon Hull North
Party	Candidate	Votes	%	±%
Labour	Henry Solomons	20,664	43.31	−0.64
Conservative	Michael Coulson	19,483	40.83	−4.47
Liberal	Laurie Millward	7,570	15.86	+5.11
Majority		1,181	2.48	N/A
Turnout		47,717	77.23	−4.32
Labour gain from Conservative		Swing		

1966 Kingston upon Hull North by-election
Party	Candidate	Votes	%	±%
Labour	Kevin McNamara	24,479	52.22	+8.91
Conservative	Toby Jessel	19,128	40.81	+0.05
Liberal	Laurie Millward	2,945	6.28	−11.58
Radical Alliance	Richard Gott	253	0.54	New
Independent	Russell Eckley	35	0.07	New
Independent	Kelvin Woodburne	33	0.07	New
Majority		5,351	11.41	+8.93
Turnout		46,873		
Labour hold		Swing	+4.4	

1966 general election: Kingston upon Hull North
Party	Candidate	Votes	%	±%
Labour	Kevin McNamara	26,640	55.20	+2.98
Conservative	Toby Jessel	17,871	37.03	−3.78
Liberal	Laurie Millward	3,747	7.76	+1.48
Majority		8,769	18.17	
Turnout		48,258	78.97	
Labour hold		Swing		

=== Elections in the 1970s ===
1970 general election: Kingston upon Hull North
Party	Candidate	Votes	%	±%
Labour	Kevin McNamara	26,302	57.15	+1.95
Conservative	John Townend	17,912	38.92	+1.89
Anti-Common Market	Walter Harvey	1,808	3.93	New
Majority		8,390	18.23	+0.06
Turnout		46,022	70.09	−8.88
Labour hold		Swing		

== See also ==
- List of parliamentary constituencies in Humberside
