= List of schools in Kingston upon Hull =

This is a list of schools in Kingston upon Hull in the East Riding of Yorkshire, England.

== State-funded schools ==
=== Primary schools ===
- Adelaide Primary School
- Ainthorpe Primary School
- Alderman Cogan's CE Primary School
- Appleton Primary School
- Bellfield Primary School
- Biggin Hill Primary School
- Bricknell Primary School
- Broadacre Primary School
- Buckingham Primary Academy
- Bude Park Primary School
- Cavendish Primary School
- Chiltern Primary School
- Christopher Pickering Primary School
- Cleeve Primary School
- Clifton Primary School
- Collingwood Primary School
- Craven Primary Academy
- Dorchester Primary School
- Eastfield Primary School
- Endike Academy
- Endsleigh Holy Child RC Academy
- Estcourt Primary Academy
- Francis Askew Primary School
- Gillshill Primary School
- Lift Green Way
- Griffin Primary School
- Hall Road Academy
- Highlands Primary School
- Ings Primary School
- Kingswood Parks Primary School
- Longhill Primary School
- Marfleet Primary Academy
- Maybury Primary School
- Mersey Primary Academy
- Mountbatten Primary School
- Neasden Primary School
- Newington Academy
- Newland St John's CE Academy
- Oldfleet Primary School
- Paisley Primary School
- The Parks Primary Academy
- Parkstone Primary School
- Pearson Primary School
- Priory Primary School
- Rokeby Park Primary School
- St Andrew's CE Primary School
- St Anthony's RC Academy
- St Charles' RC Academy
- St George's Primary School
- St James' CE Academy
- St Mary Queen of Martyrs RC Academy
- St Nicholas Primary School
- St Richard's RC Academy
- St Thomas More RC Academy
- St Vincent's RC Academy
- Sidmouth Primary School
- Southcoates Primary Academy
- Spring Cottage Primary School
- Stepney Primary School
- Stockwell Academy
- Stoneferry Primary School
- Sutton Park Primary School
- Thanet Primary School
- Thoresby Primary School
- Thorpepark Academy
- Victoria Dock Primary School
- Wansbeck Primary School
- Westcott Primary School
- Wheeler Primary School
- Wold Academy
- Woodland Primary School

=== Secondary schools ===
- Archbishop Sentamu Academy
- The Boulevard Academy
- Hull Trinity House Academy
- Kelvin Hall School
- Kingswood Academy
- Malet Lambert School
- The Marvell College
- Newland School for Girls
- Ron Dearing UTC
- St Mary's College
- Sirius Academy North
- Sirius Academy West
- Winifred Holtby Academy

=== Special and alternative schools ===
- Aspire Academy
- Bridgeview Special School
- The Compass Academy
- Euler Academy
- Frederick Holmes School
- Ganton School
- Northcott School
- Oakfield
- Rise Academy
- The Sullivan Centre
- Tweendykes School
- The Venn Boulevard Centre
- Whitehouse Pupil Referral Unit

=== Further education ===
- Endeavour Learning and Skills Centre
- Hull College
- Wilberforce College
- Wyke College

== Independent schools ==
=== Primary and preparatory schools ===
- Froebel House School

=== Senior and all-through schools ===
- Hymers College
