= 1966 Kingston upon Hull North by-election =

UK parliamentary by-election

The 1966 Kingston upon Hull North by-election of 27 January 1966 was held after the death of Labour Member of Parliament (MP) Henry Solomons on 7 November 1965. The seat was retained with an increased majority by Kevin McNamara of the Labour Party. This has been attributed to the announcement of the construction of the Humber Bridge by the government during the campaign.

== Previous result ==
1964 general election: Kingston upon Hull North
Party	Candidate	Votes	%	±%
Labour	Henry Solomons	20,664	43.31	−0.64
Conservative	Michael Coulson	19,483	40.83	−4.47
Liberal	Laurie Millward	7,570	15.86	+5.11
Majority		1,181	2.48	N/A
Turnout		47,717	77.23	−4.32
Labour gain from Conservative		Swing		

== Result ==
1966 Kingston upon Hull North by-election
Party	Candidate	Votes	%	±%
Labour	Kevin McNamara	24,479	52.22	+8.91
Conservative	Toby Jessel	19,128	40.81	+0.05
Liberal	Laurie Millward	2,945	6.28	−11.58
Radical Alliance	Richard Gott	253	0.54	New
Independent	Russell E. Eckley	35	0.07	New
Independent	Kelvin Woodburne	33	0.07	New
Majority		5,351	11.41	+8.93
Turnout		46,873		
Labour hold		Swing	+4.4	

== Aftermath ==
Harold Wilson's Labour Party formed a government after winning a majority of four seats at the 1964 general election. Shortly after this by-election, Wilson called a general election for 31 March. Wilson's hope that he would be returned to office with a larger majority had been encouraged by the government's victory at the Kingston upon Hull North by-election. In the end, Wilson's decision was vindicated, as Labour was returned with a larger majority of 96 seats.
