= WebCameron =

WebCameron (a portmanteau of webcam and Cameron) was a series of online videos recorded by the British Conservative Party leader David Cameron between 2006 and 2010, while the Conservatives were the party of opposition, and Cameron was Leader of the Opposition. Named after Cameron, the series was launched with much publicity in September 2006, when the party was keen to rebrand itself as a modern entity by embracing new technology, and appealing to a younger generation of voters adept at using online media.

== History ==
David Cameron was elected to lead the Conservative Party in December 2005 on a platform of making the party appeal to a wider electorate, and to those who had not previously voted for them. His director of strategy, Steve Hilton realised the potential of using websites such as the recently launched video-sharing website YouTube to by-pass traditional media, such as television broadcasters, and attract new voters. Political parties in the UK, including the Conservatives, had established websites before the 1997 general election, but had not embraced the technology as a campaigning tool. Consequently, after 2005, the party hired Rishi Saha, a former nightclub manager, to bolster its online presence, and WebCameron was established as part of its digital strategy. The WebCameron videos were made available on the website www.webcameron.org.uk, as well as via YouTube. There was also an online discussion forum facility. At the time of WebCameron's launch, the Conservatives described the series as providing "behind-the-scenes access" to Cameron, while Sam Roake, who helped to run the site, said the videos "very much [represent] the values of David Cameron's Conservative party, of openness and community".

The first video uploaded to the WebCameron site, on 30 September 2006, showed Cameron washing up in his kitchen while his family ate breakfast, and featured him setting out his party's aims: "I want to tell you what the Conservative party is doing, what we're up to, give you behind-the-scenes access so you can actually see what policies we're developing, the things that we are doing, and have that direct link ... watch out BBC, ITV, Channel 4, we're the new competition. We're a bit shaky and wobbly, but this is one of the ways we want to communicate with people properly about what the Conservative party stands for." Subsequent videos featured Cameron in different settings, while offering his thoughts on a variety of topics, and generally appeared at the rate of one or two a week. Among videos recorded for the series was footage of Cameron celebrating Diwali at Neasden's Swaminarayan Temple, a discussion of British achievements at the 2008 Summer Olympics, and Cameron offering his thoughts on how to clean up British politics.

In a video posted in January 2007, Cameron called for the legalisation of medical marijuana. In May 2007, after he was the guest of a Muslim family living in Birmingham's Balsall Heath district, Cameron posted highlights of the visit to WebCameron. The video showed him living and working with the family, and discussing topical issues with the local community. Shortly after that, Cameron spent two days as a teaching assistant at Kingswood School, a comprehensive school in Kingston upon Hull, footage of which was also uploaded to the site. Also in 2007, Cameron used the website to challenge Gordon Brown to a live televised political debate as he prepared to succeed Tony Blair as Prime Minister, arguing the format had proved useful for discussing "serious policy issues" during the 2005 Conservative leadership election. Cameron's wife, Samantha made her WebCameron debut in April 2010, ahead of that year's general election. The WebCameron YouTube channel was renamed Sam WebCameron for the duration of the weeks preceding the election, and was part of the Conservatives' campaign to attract young female voters. In 2007, the Conservatives apologised after a forum discussing the "sexiest female MP" attracted some negative media attention, and the thread was removed.

In Cameron’s Conservatives and the Internet: Change, Culture and Cyber Toryism, Anthony Ridge-Newman reports that daily visitor traffic for WebCameron stood at 150,000 in the initial phase of the project, before falling to 5,000–6,000 during its latter years. By 2010, the WebCameron series had been moved from the webcameron.org.uk site to the main Conservative Party website. A Good Web Guide review described the series as "[offering] little more than another platform for the broadcast of policy, rather than a two-way dialogue between the elected and the electors". After the Conservatives formed a government following the 2010 general election and Cameron became Prime Minister, 10 Downing Street announced that he would continue to record the WebCameron videos. In November 2010, Nicky Woodhouse, who was in charge of running the WebCameron site, was appointed as the government's official film-maker, but stepped down from the role after two weeks when the appointment was perceived negatively by the media and public. The WebCameron series attracted some renewed media interest when it was deleted from YouTube in November 2013, particularly as it coincided with the removal of a decade of Cameron's speeches from the Conservative Party's website. However, the material remains available through the UK Web Archive.

== Legacy ==
In 2007, Labour launched Labourvision, a series of videos inspired by the WebCameron model. The videos had their own YouTube channel, and featured prominent Labour figures discussing policy issues. In 2008, Labour leader and Prime Minister Gordon Brown launched Ask the PM, a YouTube channel on which he would answer questions put to him by subscribers. Brown's public image had been an issue with voters during his time as prime minister, and Ask the PM was an attempt to revitalise his image. Conservative MP Douglas Carswell launched clactontv.com, a website following a similar video-sharing format in November 2006. WebCameron was also the subject of satire, with some sending up Cameron's attempt to connect with a younger generation. One notable example of this occurred in October 2006, when MP Siôn Simon recorded a video titled "DaveCam" in which he mocked Cameron's presenting style while wearing a baseball cap, inviting viewers to sleep with his wife and take his children. The Financial Times reported that the video resulted in an increase in traffic to the WebCameron site. Simon deleted the clip following criticism about its content from Conservative and Labour MPs. Another spoof of the videos was made by supporters of the UK Independence Party who established a website with a similar address to the WebCameron URL, and redirected visitors to a spoof Armando Iannucci video set to David Bowie's song, "Changes" and that had appeared on his television show Time Trumpet.

== See also ==
- ConservativeHome
- LabourList
