= Kingston upon Hull North and Cottingham =

UK Parliament constituency (since 2024)

Coordinates: 53.78°N 0.37°W

- Borough constituency for the House of Commons
- Interactive map of boundaries since 2024
- Boundary within Yorkshire and the Humber
- County: East Riding of Yorkshire

Current constituency
- Created: 2024
- Member of Parliament: Diana Johnson (Labour)
- Seats: One
- Created from: Kingston upon Hull North; Haltemprice and Howden (part); Kingston upon Hull West and Hessle (minor part); Kingston upon Hull East (minor part)

Kingston upon Hull North and Cottingham is a constituency of the House of Commons in the UK Parliament. It was established by the 2023 periodic review of Westminster constituencies and is currently represented by Diana Johnson of the Labour Party, who was MP for the predecessor seat of Kingston upon Hull North from 2005 to 2024.

== Constituency profile ==
Kingston upon Hull North and Cottingham is a constituency located in the East Riding of Yorkshire. It covers the northern area of the city of Kingston upon Hull—more commonly known as Hull—including the neighbourhoods of the Avenues, Sculcoates, Newland, Inglemire, Orchard Park, Kingswood and most of Bransholme. The constituency also includes the large village of Cottingham, which lies outside the city's boundaries. Kingston-upon-Hull is an industrial city based at the confluence of the River Hull and the Humber estuary and has been an important port city for around 800 years. The city has been described as an "up and coming" place to live. The constituency contains the University of Hull, which has around 15,000 students. The constituency is divided in terms of wealth; Orchard Park, Bransholme and the areas close to the city centre contain much social housing and fall within the top 10% most-deprived areas in England, whilst Newland, Kingswood and Cottingham are generally affluent and suburban in character. The average house price in the constituency is lower than the rest of Yorkshire and around half the national average.

In general, residents of the constituency are young, have average levels of education and low rates of homeownership. Household income is low and residents are less likely to work in professional occupations compared to the rest of the country. A high proportion of residents work in healthcare and education. White people made up 90% of the population at the 2021 census. At the local council level, the more deprived neighbourhoods are represented by Labour Party councillors whilst the more affluent areas elected Liberal Democrats. An estimated 58% of voters supported leaving the European Union in the 2016 referendum, higher than the nationwide figure of 52%.

== Boundaries ==
The constituency is composed of the following (as they existed on 1 December 2020):

- The District of East Riding of Yorkshire wards of Cottingham North and Cottingham South.
- The City of Kingston upon Hull wards of Avenue, Beverley & Newland, Bricknell, Central, Kingswood, Orchard Park, University, and West Carr.

The seat comprises the following areas of former constituencies:

- The majority of the previous Kingston upon Hull North constituency – excluding the North Carr ward, which was moved to Kingston upon Hull East
- The large suburb of Cottingham, previously in the constituency of Haltemprice and Howden (abolished and broken up)

== Members of Parliament ==
Kingston upon Hull North prior to 2024

Election	Member	Party
2024	Diana Johnson	Labour

== Elections ==
=== Elections in the 2020s ===
General election 2024: Kingston upon Hull North & Cottingham
Party	Candidate	Votes	%	±%
Labour	Diana Johnson	18,480	48.3	+1.7
Reform	Martin Baker	7,801	20.4	+9.6
Conservative	Callum Terence Procter	4,897	12.8	−20.7
Liberal Democrats	Craig Woolmer	3,246	8.5	+2.0
Green	Kerry Elizabeth Harrison	2,322	6.1	+3.5
Independent	Ahmet Cinalp	720	1.9	N/A
Yorkshire	Rowan Adam Halstead	339	0.9	N/A
TUSC	Michael John Whale	262	0.7	N/A
Independent	Pauline Peachey	161	0.4	N/A
Majority		10,769	27.9	+14.7
Turnout		38,228	50.8	–8.3
Registered electors		75,280		
Labour hold		Swing	−4.0	

=== Elections in the 2010s ===
2019 notional result
Party	Vote	%
Labour	20,959	46.6
Conservative	15,037	33.5
Brexit Party	4,857	10.8
Liberal Democrats	2,915	6.5
Green	1,173	2.6
Turnout	44,941	59.1
Electorate	76,039	

== See also ==
- List of parliamentary constituencies in Humberside
- List of parliamentary constituencies in the Yorkshire and the Humber (region)
