= Henry Solomons =

British politician (1902–1965)

Member of Parliament for Kingston upon Hull North
- In office 15 October 1964 – 7 November 1965
- Preceded by: Michael Coulson
- Succeeded by: Kevin McNamara

Personal details
- Born: 7 November 1902
- Died: 7 November 1965 (aged 63)
- Party: Labour

Henry Solomons (7 November 1902 – 7 November 1965) was a British businessman, trade unionist and Labour Party politician who briefly enjoyed a Parliamentary career.

== Early career ==
Solomons was born in London and educated at London County Council schools, and went into sales as a profession. He joined the trade union Union of Shop, Distributive and Allied Workers and the Labour Party in 1932, and two years later was elected to Stepney Borough Council.

On the outbreak of the Second World War Solomons enlisted in the army and resigned from the council. He served in the middle east. At the end of the war, he returned to his old job. He became Organising Secretary for the Union of Liberal and Progressive Synagogues in 1946, a job which lasted eight years.

During his time in the Army Solomons took part in the Cairo Forces Parliament.

== Political advancement ==
Solomons' political career advanced in the early 1950s. He served on the Executive of the London Labour Party from 1952 to 1960. From 1953 Solomons served on Hammersmith Borough Council. He became a full-time officer of USDAW in 1954. He was also a Governor of Westminster Hospital.

== Parliament ==
At the 1964 general election Solomons was elected as Labour member of parliament for Kingston upon Hull North, gaining the seat from the Conservatives. However, his health was not good, and was not helped by the stresses of a close Parliament. He collapsed after an all-night sitting in June 1965. He was required to remain in Parliament so that he could be 'nodded through' in Divisions.

Solomons died on his 63rd birthday in Westminster hospital, leaving Labour with 313 seats in the House of Commons, a majority of only one vote over its opposition (the Conservative Party had 303 and the Liberals 9). His death precipitated a byelection in a very marginal constituency; Labour's successful defence of the seat led Harold Wilson to call the 1966 general election.

Parliament of the United Kingdom
Preceded by Michael Coulson	Member of Parliament for Kingston upon Hull North; 1964–1965	Succeeded by Kevin McNamara
