= Austen Hudson =

Austen Hudson CBE

Member of Parliament for Kingston upon Hull North
- In office 23 February 1950 – 18 September 1959
- Preceded by: Constituency created
- Succeeded by: Michael Coulson

Personal details
- Born: Walter Richard Austen Hudson; 8 December 1894 Pudsey, West Yorkshire
- Died: 21 August 1970 (aged 75)
- Party: Conservative
- Spouse: Marion Hyde (m. 1917)
- Children: Margaret Jean, Patricia, Richard
- Parent(s): Walter Richard Hudson; Clara Porter

Walter Richard Austen Hudson (8 December 1894 – 21 August 1970) was a Conservative Party politician in the United Kingdom.

He was elected as Member of Parliament (MP) for Kingston upon Hull North at the 1950 general election, and held the seat until he retired from the House of Commons at the 1959 general election.

Parliament of the United Kingdom
New constituency	Member of Parliament for Kingston upon Hull North; 1950–1959	Succeeded by Michael Coulson
