= Diana Johnson =

British politician (born 1966)

The Right Honourable Dame Diana Johnson DBE MP
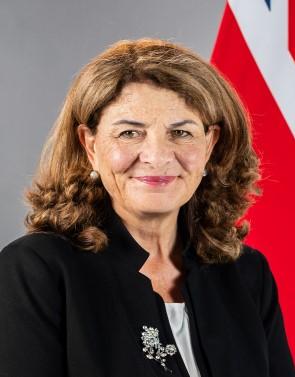
- Official portrait, 2024

Minister of State for Public Health and Patient Safety
- Incumbent
- Assumed office 21 July 2026
- Prime Minister: Andy Burnham
- Preceded by: Sharon Hodgson

Minister of State for Employment
- In office 6 September 2025 – 21 July 2026
- Prime Minister: Keir Starmer
- Preceded by: Alison McGovern
- Succeeded by: Andrew Western

Minister of State for Policing and Crime Prevention
- In office 8 July 2024 – 6 September 2025
- Prime Minister: Keir Starmer
- Preceded by: Chris Philp
- Succeeded by: Sarah Jones

Chair of the Home Affairs Select Committee
- In office 15 December 2021 – 30 May 2024
- Preceded by: Tim Loughton (acting)
- Succeeded by: Karen Bradley

Parliamentary Under-Secretary of State for Schools
- In office 5 June 2009 – 11 May 2010
- Prime Minister: Gordon Brown
- Preceded by: Sarah McCarthy-Fry
- Succeeded by: The Lord Hill of Oareford

Assistant Government Whip
- In office 28 June 2007 – 9 June 2009
- Leader: Gordon Brown
- Preceded by: Ian Cawsey
- Succeeded by: Mary Creagh

Member of Parliament for Kingston upon Hull North and Cottingham Kingston upon Hull North (2005–2024)
- Incumbent
- Assumed office 5 May 2005
- Preceded by: Kevin McNamara
- Majority: 10,679 (27.9%)

Member of the London Assembly as an additional member
- In office 1 March 2003 – 10 June 2004
- Preceded by: Trevor Phillips

Personal details
- Born: Diana Ruth Johnson; 25 July 1966 (age 60) Northwich, Cheshire, England
- Party: Labour
- Spouse: Kevin Morton
- Education: Queen Mary University of London
- Occupation: Barrister
- Website: Official website

Dame Diana Ruth Johnson DBE (born 25 July 1966) is a British politician who has served as the Member of Parliament (MP) for Kingston upon Hull North since the 2005 general election. A member of the Labour Party, she has served as Minister of State for Public Health and Patient Safety since 2026.

During the Brown ministry, she served as Parliamentary Under Secretary of State for Schools in the Department for Children, Schools and Families, as well as being an Assistant Government Whip.

== Early life ==
Johnson was born in Northwich, Cheshire. After returning from wartime service in the Navy her father, Eric Johnson, founded the Eric Johnson electrical engineering company in Little Leigh near Northwich, Cheshire (now continued by his son). She passed the Eleven plus and attended the Northwich County Grammar School for Girls (later the County High School Leftwich). At sixth form level she studied at Sir John Deane's College from 1982 to 1984 where she studied history, English and Economics.

She gained an LLB in Law from Queen Mary University of London. She became a barrister in 1991. From 1999 to 2005, she was a Barrister in Law at Paddington Law Centre.

Johnson was a councillor in the London Borough of Tower Hamlets from 1994 to 2002, serving as Chair of Social services. She became a member of the London Assembly on 1 March 2003 after the resignation of Trevor Phillips who became chair of the Commission for Racial Equality, having been next on the list of London-wide members at the 2000 election. She did not stand for re-election in 2004.

== Parliamentary career ==
She stood unsuccessfully in Brentwood and Ongar at the 2001 general election.

At the 2005 general election, she was elected Labour Member of Parliament for the Kingston upon Hull North constituency, succeeding veteran Labour MP Kevin McNamara. She is Hull's first female MP.

In November 2005 Johnson was appointed as a Parliamentary Private Secretary to the Minister of State for Pensions Reform, Stephen Timms. In 2007 she left this role to become an assistant Government Whip. She took on the additional role of Parliamentary Under Secretary of State for Schools in the reshuffle of June 2009.

During the United Kingdom parliamentary expenses scandal it was revealed that Johnson had claimed £987 in architects' fees for her second home, which she voluntarily repaid, and had a £563 claim for crockery rejected as "excessive".

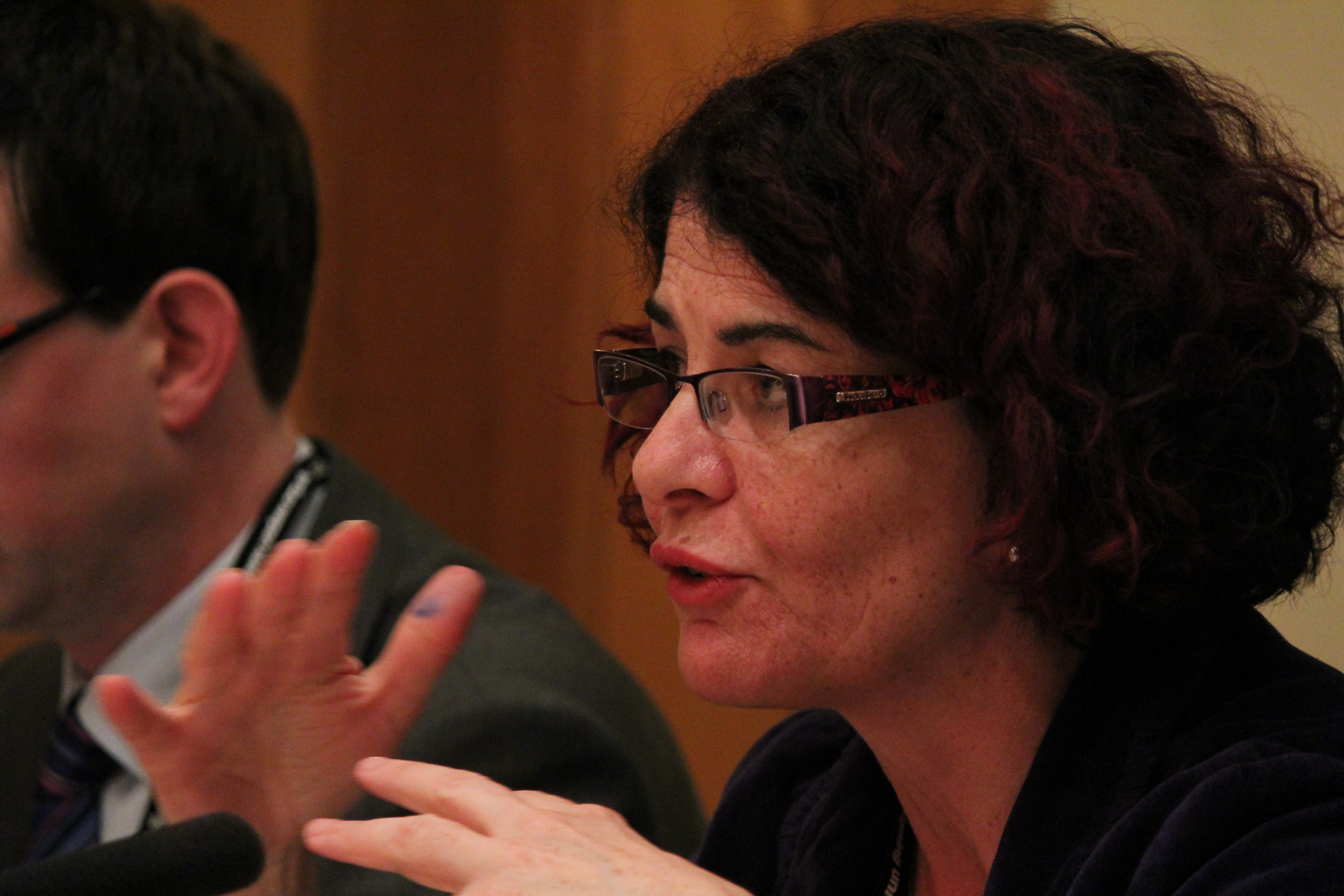
Diana Johnson in 2013

In the 2010 general election Johnson polled 39.2% of the vote and held onto the Hull North constituency for Labour with her majority reduced to 641 votes.

In 2014, Johnson proposed a Bill under the Ten Minute Rule that would require sex and relationships education, including discussions around issues such as consent, to be made a compulsory part of the National Curriculum.

Johnson was appointed in September 2015 by Jeremy Corbyn, shortly after he became Labour party leader, as a shadow minister in the Foreign and Commonwealth team. In late June 2016, along with colleagues, she resigned as a shadow minister, unhappy at Corbyn's leadership following the 'leave' vote in the European membership referendum. She supported Owen Smith in the 2016 Labour leadership election.

She is co-chair of the APPG on Haemophilia and Contaminated Blood, campaigned on the Contaminated Blood Scandal and, in November 2018, received the Political Studies Association's 'Backbencher of the Year' award in recognition of her efforts.

In September 2019, Johnson became the first Labour MP to face a full reselection process by her local party after members voted that she should face a challenge. On 25 October 2019, Johnson's local party voted by 292 votes to 101 to reselect her as the candidate for the next election. She was re-elected in the 2019 general election.

In the 2025 British cabinet reshuffle, Johnson was moved out of the Home Office along with Angela Eagle. She moved to become Minister of State for Employment.

In July 2026, she was reappointed to the new government as Minister of State at the Department of Health and Social Care by Andy Burnham.

== Political positions ==
=== Prostitution ===
On 9 December 2020, Johnson introduced a Ten Minute Rule bill that would introduce the Nordic model approach to prostitution, which would criminalise those paying for sex and criminalise websites which advertise prostitution. The bill was strongly criticised and opposed by sex workers including the English Collective of Prostitutes group, women's rights organisations, trade unions, Amnesty International and thousands of individuals, who argued that this legislation would push the industry underground and put sex workers in danger.

=== Israel ===
In September 2020, Johnson was appointed a vice-chair of Labour Friends of Israel.

In November 2021, Johnson in the Jewish News wrote an article supporting a speech by Keir Starmer that opposed the Boycott, Divestment and Sanctions of Israel. She said "Rejecting anti-Zionist antisemitism means opposing the BDS movement which demonises and delegitimises Israel, singling it out for boycotts and sanctions."

=== Abortion ===
In July 2021, Diana Johnson proposed an amendment that would liberalise abortion in England and Wales. Proponents of the amendment suggested this would bring English and Welsh law in line with recent legislative changes in Northern Ireland. However, Johnson was strongly criticised for not clarifying whether this would allow for abortion up until birth. It has also been suggested by pro-life organisations that this would have removed the requirement for a doctor to be involved, allow for sex selective abortion and removed conscience protections for those medical professionals who object to abortion.

Johnson was also criticised by 800 medical professionals in a letter that suggested such an amendment would remove legal safeguards for both the mother and child and pointed out that extensions to the 24 week limit were only supported by 1% of the UK population according to a recent Savanta ComRes poll. Johnson received little support in Parliament for the amendment and was also criticised by some pro-choice politicians. Johnson declined to take the amendment to a vote.

In 2024, Johnson's amendment to the Criminal Justice Bill, which would decriminalise women themselves in relation to their own pregnancies but would leave the rest of abortion law and regulation unchanged, has been backed by the Royal College of Obstetricians and Gynaecologists, the British Medical Association, Mumsnet, and many groups who work with survivors of gender based violence such as Women's Aid and Karma Nirvana. Conservative Chancellor Jeremy Hunt, who has previously backed a reduction in abortion time limits, has indicated he may support her amendment. The Health Secretary Victoria Atkins has also suggested she may vote for the amendment.

=== Brexit ===
Johnson supported the indicative Parliamentary votes on Brexit and her local paper Hull Live reported that she had been threatened along with fellow Hull MP Emma Hardy on social media with being "shot and hanged" for this position.

=== Votes at 16 ===
In 2017, Johnson co-sponsored a Bill in Parliament that would have granted 16-year-olds the right to vote in Parliamentary elections.

== Honours ==
Johnson was appointed Dame Commander of the Order of the British Empire (DBE) in the 2020 New Year Honours for charitable and political service, in part for her campaigning on contaminated blood transfusions. She was appointed to the Privy Council on 10 March 2021.

Parliament of the United Kingdom
Preceded by Kevin McNamara	Member of Parliament for Kingston upon Hull North; 2005–2024	Constituency abolished
New constituency	Member of Parliament for Kingston upon Hull North and Cottingham; 2024–present	Incumbent
