= Bransholme water works =

Water works in Kingston upon Hull, East Riding of Yorkshire, England

Coordinates: 53.790158°N 0.350862°W

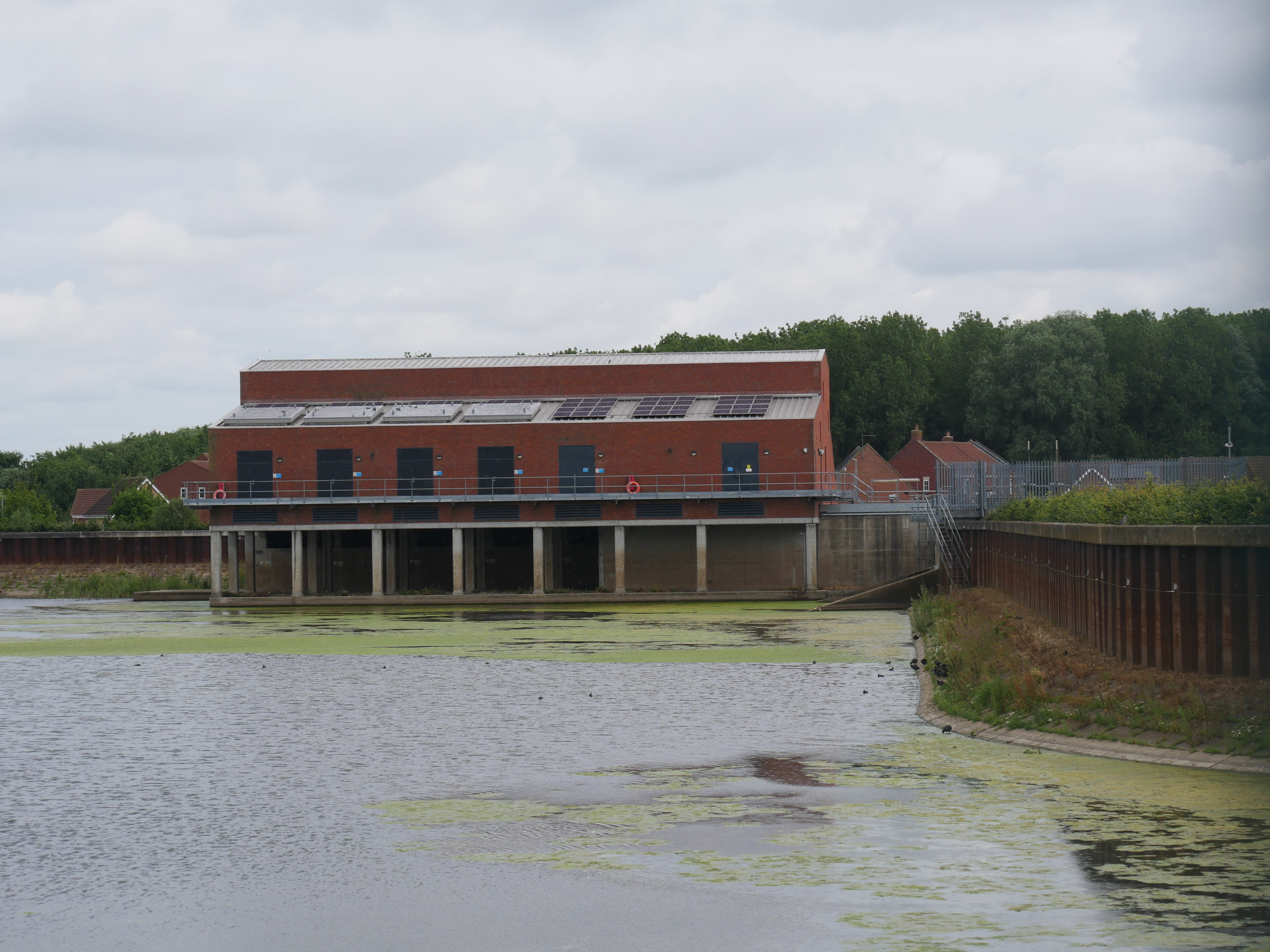
Storage lagoon and pumping station

Bransholme water works is a surface water storage and pumping station serving the Bransholme and Kingswood estates in Kingston upon Hull, England. The facility was originally built in the late 1960s for both surface and waste water, and included a storage lagoon and sewage works – the sewage works was replaced c. 2000 by a large waste water treatment facility near Saltend near the banks of the Humber Estuary.

The current (2015) facility pumps and stores surface water, discharging into the River Hull. Waste water is pumped to a sewage works near Saltend.

== Description ==
Waste water treatment in the Bransholme and Kingswood areas of Hull is separated from that of the rest of Hull. Separate surface water and foul water systems drain to the facility at Bransholme. Surface water is discharged into the River Hull, with an intermediate storage lagoon used to store water when river levels are high. Foul water is pumped to the 'Humbercare' sewage works near Saltend.

== History ==
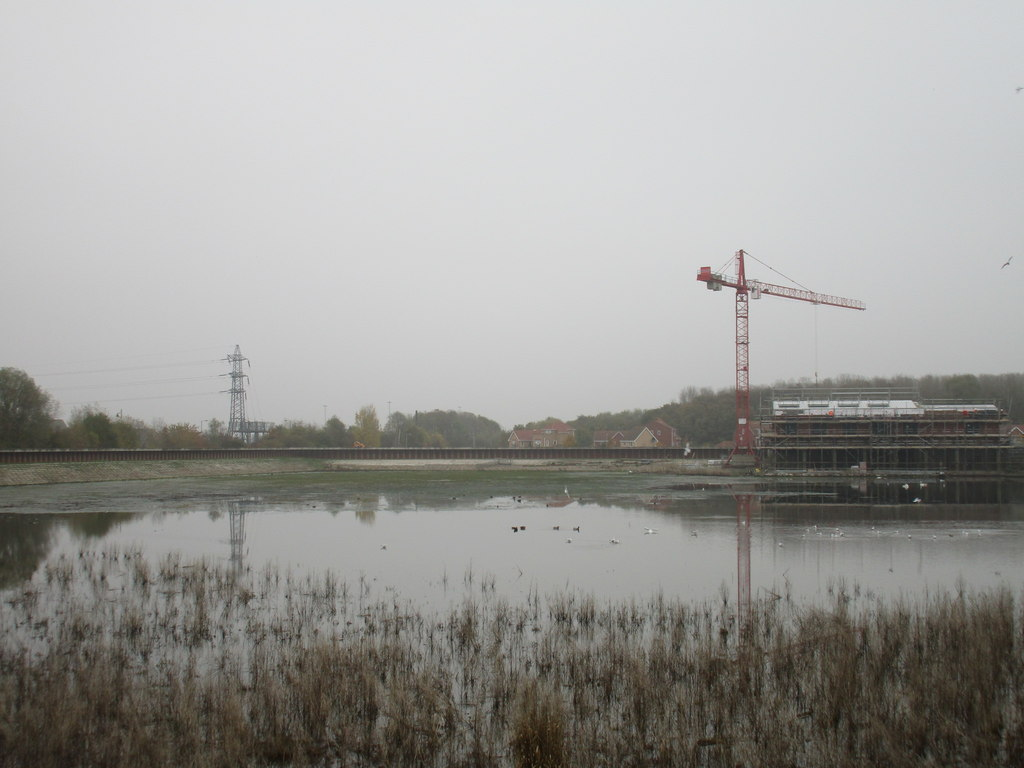
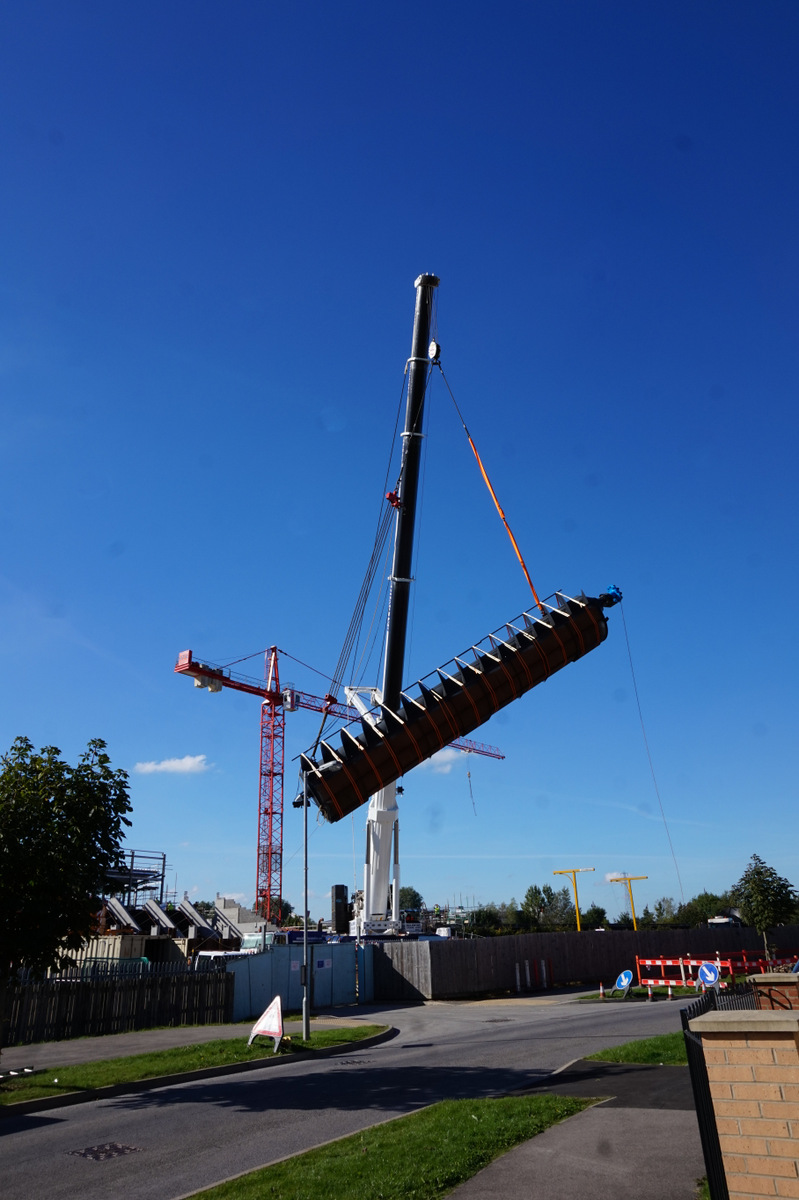
Construction of the improved waterworks in 2015, including the installation of an Archimedes screw pump (right)

A sewage works was built adjacent to the east bank of the River Hull in the late 1960s, an ancillary to the construction of the large Bransholme Estate to the east and south. The works was located to the south of the Wawne drain at Roe Bank. A linear mound was constructed to the east, shielding views from the estate. The estate required a new drainage system to be built – effluent at the new plant was to discharge into the river. The works also included a water storage lagoon, built to hold water when the level of the river was high. By 1972 the new works was discharging 4,100 cubic metres (140,000 cu ft) of treated sewage effluent into the river.

After c. 2000 the sewage works at Bransholme was closed, with effluent to be pumped to a new large waste water treatment works (Hull WwTW) near the Humber Estuary; the works was part of the £200 million 'Humbercare' sewage scheme built to comply with European standards on sewage disposal. The Humbercare system excluded surface water at Bransholme.

In 2007 (see 2007 United Kingdom floods) a surface water pump failed at the pumping station, the failure led to a delay in the Bransholme area being cleared of water after the flood event.

The area south-east of the storage lagoon, once in part containing the sewage works was developed as housing after 2007 (Selset Way).

Following the floods the surface water storage and pumping station at Bransholme was upgraded. The 74,000 cubic metres (2,600,000 cu ft) storage lagoon was expanded by raising its wall, increasing storage to 100,000 cubic metres (3,500,000 cu ft). To improve pumping capacity six Archimedes screw pump of 3.75 metres (12.3 ft) diameter were installed between 2014 and 2015, each with a pumping capacity of 3.94 cubic metres (139 cu ft) per second.

== Ecology ==
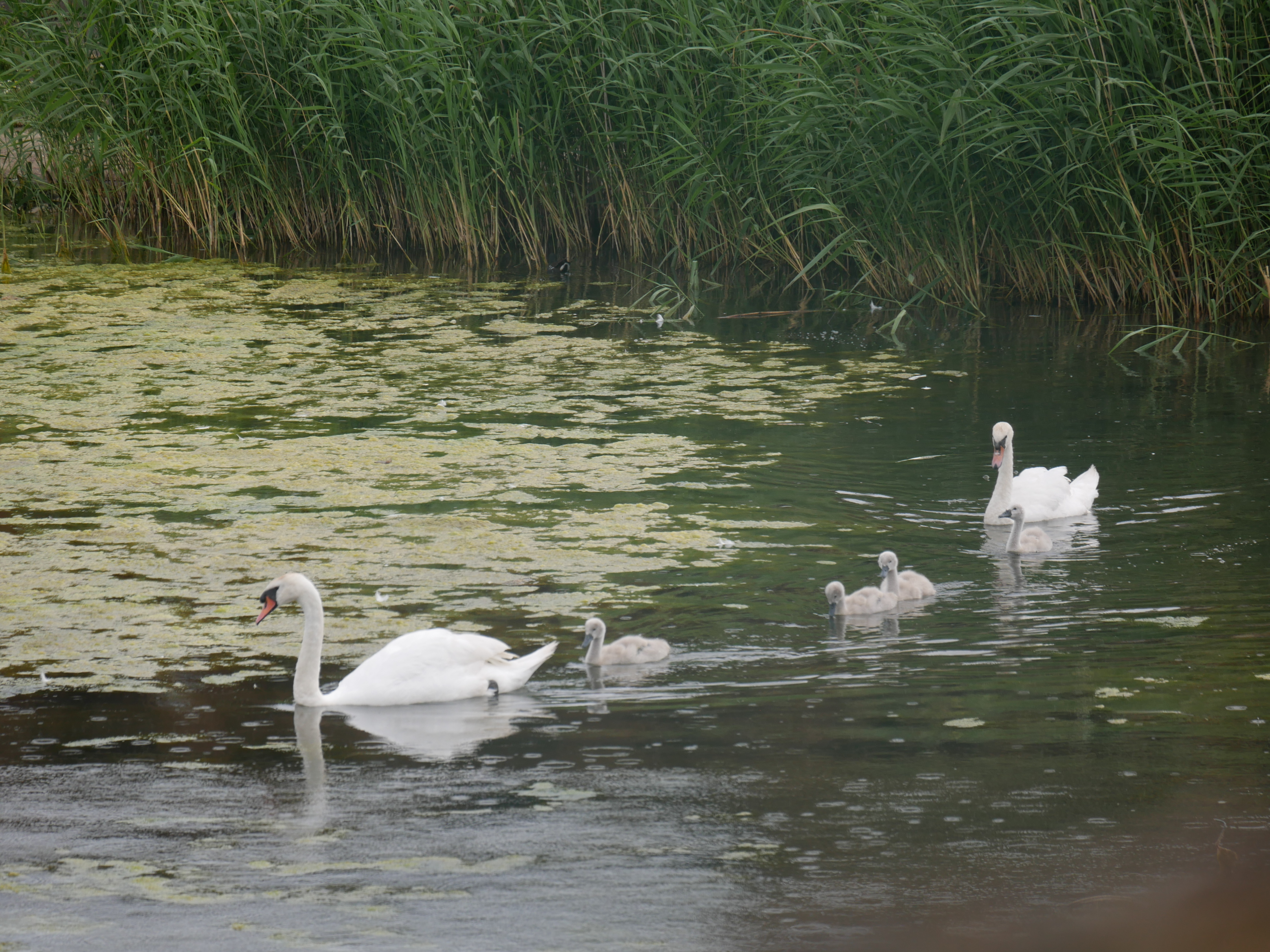
Swans and cygnets in the storage lagoon

The storage lagoon has been designated a Site of Nature Conservation Interest (SNCI). Surveys have recorded the presence of water vole, smooth newts and grass snakes in an adjacent wetland nature reserve, and a wide variety of bird species have been recorded at the lagoon. Other species found have included eels and non-native terrapins in the lagoon.
