= Ged Dunn =

English rugby player (1946–2021)

Personal information
- Full name: Gerald Dunn
- Born: 31 October 1946 Redcar, England
- Died: 2 August 2021 (aged 74)

Playing information

Rugby union
Club
Years	Team	Pld	T	G	FG	P
1967–71	Redcar

Rugby league
- Position: Wing, Centre
Club
Years	Team	Pld	T	G	FG	P
1971–≥83	Hull Kingston Rovers	277+24	160	0	0	480
Representative
Years	Team	Pld	T	G	FG	P
1974–77	Yorkshire	6	6
1975–77	England	8	4	0	0	12

Gerald Dunn (31 October 1946 – 2 August 2021) was an English rugby union, and professional rugby league footballer, who played in the 1960s, 1970s and 1980s. He coached rugby league in the 1980s and 1990s. Dunn played rugby union for Redcar RUFC, and representative level rugby league for England and Yorkshire, and at club level for Hull Kingston Rovers, as a wing or centre, and coached rugby league for Hull Kingston Rovers.

== Playing career ==
Born in Redcar, he was educated at Sir William Turner's Grammar School and Ponteland College.

Dunn was signed by Hull Kingston Rovers from Redcar RUFC in 1971. He made his debut for Hull Kingston Rovers in 1971 playing centre, but was moved to the wing to utilise his pace. A prolific try scorer he gained county honours, and broke Hull Kingston Rovers tries in a season record in 1974 with 42. He was the joint record holder for tries in one match for Hull KR scoring six in 1974, and was top of rugby league try scorers in 1974–75.

Dunn won caps for England while at Hull Kingston Rovers in 1975 against Wales, in the 1975 Rugby League World Cup against Australia, France, New Zealand, Australia, and Australia, in 1975 against Papua New Guinea, and in 1977 against France.

Dunn played and scored a try in Hull Kingston Rovers' 16–13 victory over Wakefield Trinity in the 1974 Yorkshire Cup Final during the 1974–75 season at Headingley, Leeds on Saturday 26 October 1974, and played on the wing in the 15–11 defeat by Leeds in the 1975 Yorkshire Cup Final during the 1975–76 season at Headingley, Leeds on 15 November 1975.

Dunn played on the wing, and scored two tries in Hull Kingston Rovers' 26–11 victory over St. Helens in the 1977 BBC2 Floodlit Trophy Final during the 1977–78 season at Craven Park, Hull on Tuesday 13 December 1977. The record for the most tries in a BBC2 Floodlit Trophy Final is two, and is jointly held by Dunn, Roy Mathias, Peter Glynn, and Stuart Wright.

Dunn's testimonial match at Hull Kingston Rovers took place in 1983. Featherstone Rovers coached by Allan Agar, and holders of Challenge Cup after beating Hull F.C. were opposition.

In Roger Pugh's official Hull Kingston Rovers club history, 'The Robins' it was recorded that, "...Ged Dunn had been at Craven Park since 1971 and in his 11 playing seasons established himself as one of the club's best wingmen. In his 296 appearances for the Robins, Dunn scored 160 tries to put him in fifth place in the clubs' all-time list...Dunn was a loyal and dedicated clubman, popular with the players and a part of the fabric of the club for many years".

== Later life ==
After retiring as a rugby league footballer at Hull Kingston Rovers, he joined the coaching staff, promoted in 1986 to assistant coach to Roger Millward – then George Fairbairn – Dunn was a PE teacher at Bransholme High School (later Winifred Holtby Academy) in Kingston upon Hull for over 30 years. He influenced players such as Great Britain internationals and Hull F.C. players Lee Jackson, Richard Horne, Kirk Yeaman and Danny Houghton. Dunn also taught and influenced Graeme Horne (Hull F.C.) and Ryan Esders (Hull Kingston Rovers).

Dunn had a hip replacement in 1998, and retired in 2005.

Dunn died on 2 August 2021, at the age of 74.

== Honours ==
- Championship: 1978–79
- Yorkshire Cup: 1974–75
- BBC2 Floodlit Trophy: 1977–78
