= Kevin McNamara (politician) =

British politician (1934–2017)

Kevin McNamara KCSG

Shadow Secretary of State for Northern Ireland
- In office 13 July 1987 – 20 October 1994
- Leader: Neil Kinnock; John Smith; Margaret Beckett (acting); Tony Blair
- Shadowing: Tom King; Peter Brooke; Patrick Mayhew
- Preceded by: Peter Archer
- Succeeded by: Mo Mowlam

Member of Parliament for Kingston upon Hull North Kingston upon Hull Central (1974–1983)
- In office 27 January 1966 – 11 April 2005
- Preceded by: Henry Solomons
- Succeeded by: Diana Johnson

Personal details
- Born: Joseph Kevin McNamara; 5 September 1934 West Derby, Merseyside, England
- Died: 6 August 2017 (aged 82) Formby, Merseyside, England
- Party: Labour
- Children: 5
- Education: St Mary's College, Crosby
- Alma mater: University of Hull

Joseph Kevin McNamara KCSG (5 September 1934 – 6 August 2017) was a British Labour politician who served as a Member of Parliament (MP) for almost 40 years.

== Early life ==
Born in West Derby, Merseyside, he was educated by the Irish Christian Brothers at St Mary's College, Crosby. He studied for an LLB at the University of Hull. He was head of department in History at St Mary's Grammar School (now called St Mary's College) in Hull from 1958 to 1964 and a Law lecturer at Hull College of Commerce from 1964 to 1966.

== Parliamentary career ==
After unsuccessfully contesting Bridlington in 1964, McNamara was elected to the House of Commons as Member of Parliament (MP) for Kingston upon Hull North, in a by-election in January 1966 following the death of sitting Labour MP Henry Solomons. Labour's hold of a former marginal seat with a significantly increased majority is widely considered to have helped to convince the prime minister Harold Wilson to call the 1966 election to seek a larger majority.

McNamara retained his seat at the 1966 general election, and at subsequent elections until the constituency was abolished for the February 1974 general election, when he transferred to the new Kingston upon Hull Central constituency. When that constituency was abolished for the 1983 election, McNamara was re-elected for the re-created Kingston upon Hull North constituency.

McNamara campaigned in his last years in parliament on many issues, protesting against the Act of Succession which prohibits a Roman Catholic or the spouse of a Roman Catholic to be the British monarch. He stepped down at the 2005 general election, with the local Constituency Labour Party choosing Diana Johnson to stand in his place.

During the 2005 general election campaign McNamara claimed some of the policies regarding illegal travellers' sites of the leader of the Conservative Party, Michael Howard had a "whiff of the gas chambers" about them. Howard's grandmother was murdered at Auschwitz.

=== Northern Ireland ===
McNamara was known throughout his parliamentary career as a supporter of Irish nationalism who favoured a United Ireland. After entering parliament, he soon became interested in reports of discrimination against the Catholic minority in Northern Ireland and supported the Campaign for Democracy in Ulster] (CDU). He served as a frontbench spokesman for the Labour Party, including Shadow Secretary of State for Northern Ireland under Neil Kinnock, 1987–94, an appointment that was widely criticised by Unionists.

After Tony Blair became Labour leader, he replaced McNamara as Northern Ireland spokesman with Mo Mowlam. In 1997, he helped persuade the newly elected Labour government to donate £5,000 (thereby matching the contribution of the Irish government) for the erection of a memorial in Liverpool to the victims of the Great Irish Famine.

McNamara also supported Republicanism in the United Kingdom and joined the All-Party Parliamentary Republic Group.

== Personal life ==
McNamara was a Roman Catholic, a Knight Commander of the Pontifical Order of Saint Gregory the Great and recipient of the Order of Merit of the Italian Republic. He was married to Nora McNamara, and was the father of four sons and a daughter.

In 2006, McNamara received the honorary degree of Doctor of Laws from the University of Hull in recognition of his long service in politics. He graduated with a PhD from the University of Liverpool in 2007 having completed a thesis on the MacBride Principles at the Institute of Irish Studies, where he gave the 2008 John Kennedy Lecture in Irish Studies, Perhaps It Will All Go Away – Aspects of British Labour Policy Towards Northern Ireland, 1964 – 1970.

=== Illness and death ===
In 2017, McNamara was diagnosed with pancreatic cancer while on holiday in Spain. On 6 August, it was reported that he had died at his home in Formby, Merseyside, aged 82.

McNamara is survived by Nora, their sons, Julian, Edwin and Brendan, and their daughter, Brigid. Another son, Kieran, died in 2013.

Parliament of the United Kingdom
Preceded by Henry Solomons	Member of Parliament for Kingston upon Hull North; 1966–Feb 1974	Constituency abolished
New constituency	Member of Parliament for Kingston upon Hull Central; Feb 1974–1983	Constituency abolished
New constituency	Member of Parliament for Kingston upon Hull North; 1983–2005	Succeeded by Diana Johnson
Political offices
Preceded by Peter Archer	Shadow Secretary of State for Northern Ireland; 1987–1994	Succeeded by Paul Murphy
