= Michael Coulson (barrister) =

Member of Parliament for Kingston upon Hull North
- In office 8 October 1959 – 25 September 1964
- Preceded by: Austen Hudson
- Succeeded by: Henry Solomons

Personal details
- Born: 23 November 1927
- Died: 18 June 2002 (aged 74)
- Party: Conservative

(James) Michael Coulson (23 November 1927 – 18 June 2002) was a British barrister and judge, who also had a five-year parliamentary career. He was also an enthusiastic horse rider, huntsman and farmer, and was known at the Bar for his outstanding memory.

== Family ==
Coulson was from an East Riding of Yorkshire family in Driffield; his father was a wealthy wool merchant. He attended the independent Fulneck School in Leeds as a boarding pupil before going up to Merton College, Oxford. His national service was spent in the East Riding Yeomanry in the Wenlock's Horse.

== Early career ==
In 1951 Coulson was called to the Bar by the Middle Temple, and joined the North Eastern Circuit, although he also participated in London cases. At the same time he became active in the Young Conservatives and did much to improve their organisation in the north of England, including drafting their constitution. He was an active member of the Territorial Army in the Queen's Own Yorkshire Yeomanry where he received a commission as a Major.

== Marriage and farming ==
In 1955 he married Dilys Adair Jones, a marriage which also brought him a 400-acre (1.6 km^{2}) farm on the Jones estate at Bolton Percy near Tadcaster, North Yorkshire. Coulson enjoyed farming and trained at the Royal Agricultural College in Cirencester, but suffered an embarrassing failure while attempting to farm turkeys in a cold winter. He was forced to herd them into the farmhouse airing cupboard to keep them warm, and eventually the stockman poisoned the entire flock in a dispute with Coulson's father-in-law. Coulson also enjoyed horse riding, including fox hunting, and acted as secretary to meetings of the Bramham Moor and York and Ainsty Point to Point Race.

== Political advancement ==
Elected to Tadcaster Rural District Council, Coulson had higher ambitions and in 1958 was selected as Conservative Party candidate for Kingston upon Hull North, a seat the retiring Conservative MP, Austen Hudson held by a knife-edge majority of 590. After energetically campaigning, he won the seat at the 1959 general election with a majority which increased to 702. His maiden speech was regarded as outstandingly witty and was reported in Punch.

== Parliamentary career ==
Coulson was a loyal supporter of Harold Macmillan and Sir Alec Douglas-Home, but made his contribution by introducing a successful Private Member's Bill to abolish the farthing as legal tender. In 1962 he was appointed Parliamentary Private Secretary to the Solicitor General, Sir Peter Rawlinson. He also had an interest in Commonwealth affairs and served as a member of the executive committee of the Conservative Commonwealth Council.

== Judge ==
Losing his seat at the 1964 general election, Coulson received a promotion in his legal career as Assistant Recorder of Sheffield in 1965. He was made Deputy Chairman of the Northern Agricultural Land Tribunal in 1967, and served there for six years; from 1968 he was a Regional Chairman of Industrial Tribunals.

His marriage under strain, in the 1970s Coulson moved to the East Midlands to become a full-time chairman of Industrial Tribunals. He became a member of the Belvoir Hunt and in 1977, a hunting acquaintance twenty years his junior (Barbara Chambers) became his second wife. From 1981 he worked as a Recorder of the Crown Court, and from 1983 he was a Circuit Judge on the Midland and Oxford Circuit. In his home village of Wymondham, Leicestershire near Melton Mowbray he was known as the "hunting Judge".

In 1990 Coulson received his final promotion as a Deputy Circuit Judge. A fourth similar precedent in the law reports of that year was entered in Coulson's 1994 judgment, when on appeal, he awarded Trevor McAuley £5,900 for unfair dismissal for racism after McAuley proved a case establishing that a certain additional level of damages can be awarded for having been a victim of a vicious and highly organised campaign of making fun of his Irish accent. Coulson retired in 1998 at the age of 70.

Parliament of the United Kingdom
Preceded by Austen Hudson	Member of Parliament for Kingston upon Hull North; 1959–1964	Succeeded by Henry Solomons
