= The Boulevard Academy =

Coordinates: 53°44′24.1″N 0°22′11.5″W

Location
- Massey Close; Kingston upon Hull, East Riding of Yorkshire, HU3 3QT; England

Information
- Type: Free school
- Established: 2013
- Local authority: Hull City Council
- Department for Education URN: 139395 Tables
- Ofsted: Reports
- Principal: Ray Khan
- Gender: Coeducational
- Age: 11 to 16
- Website: www.theboulevardacademy.com

The Boulevard Academy is a co-educational secondary school located in Kingston upon Hull in the East Riding of Yorkshire, England.

It opened as a free school in September 2013, and was rated as 'outstanding' by Ofsted in 2015. As of 2024, its most recent inspection was in 2022, with an outcome of Requires Improvement.
