= Richard Gott =

British journalist and historian (1938–2025)

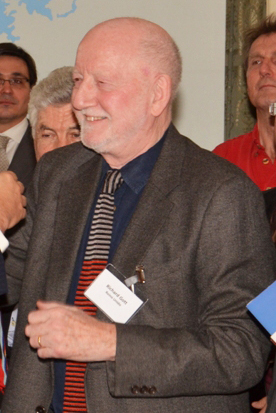
- Gott in 2013
- Born: Richard Willoughby Gott; 28 October 1938; Aston Tirrold, Oxfordshire, England
- Died: 2 November 2025 (aged 87)
- Education: Winchester College; Corpus Christi College, Oxford
- Organization: The Guardian
- Known for: Journalist, historian, author
- Spouses: Josephine Ann Johnson (m. 1966) Vivien Jane Ashley (m. 2005)

Richard Willoughby Gott (28 October 1938 – 2 November 2025) was a British journalist and historian. A Latin America correspondent and features editor for the British newspaper The Guardian, he was known for his radical politics and a connection to Che Guevara. Gott resigned from The Guardian in 1994, after senior KGB defector Oleg Gordievsky accused him of having been a Soviet "agent of influence", an accusation that Gott rejected.

== Early life and education ==
Gott was born at Aston Tirrold in the Berkshire Downs of Oxfordshire, south east England, on 28 October 1938, the son of Oxford-educated architect Arthur Francis Evelyn Gott and schoolteacher Constance Mary Moon. The Gott family had been prominent in the Yorkshire woollen industry; his paternal uncle married the politician Mavis Tate.

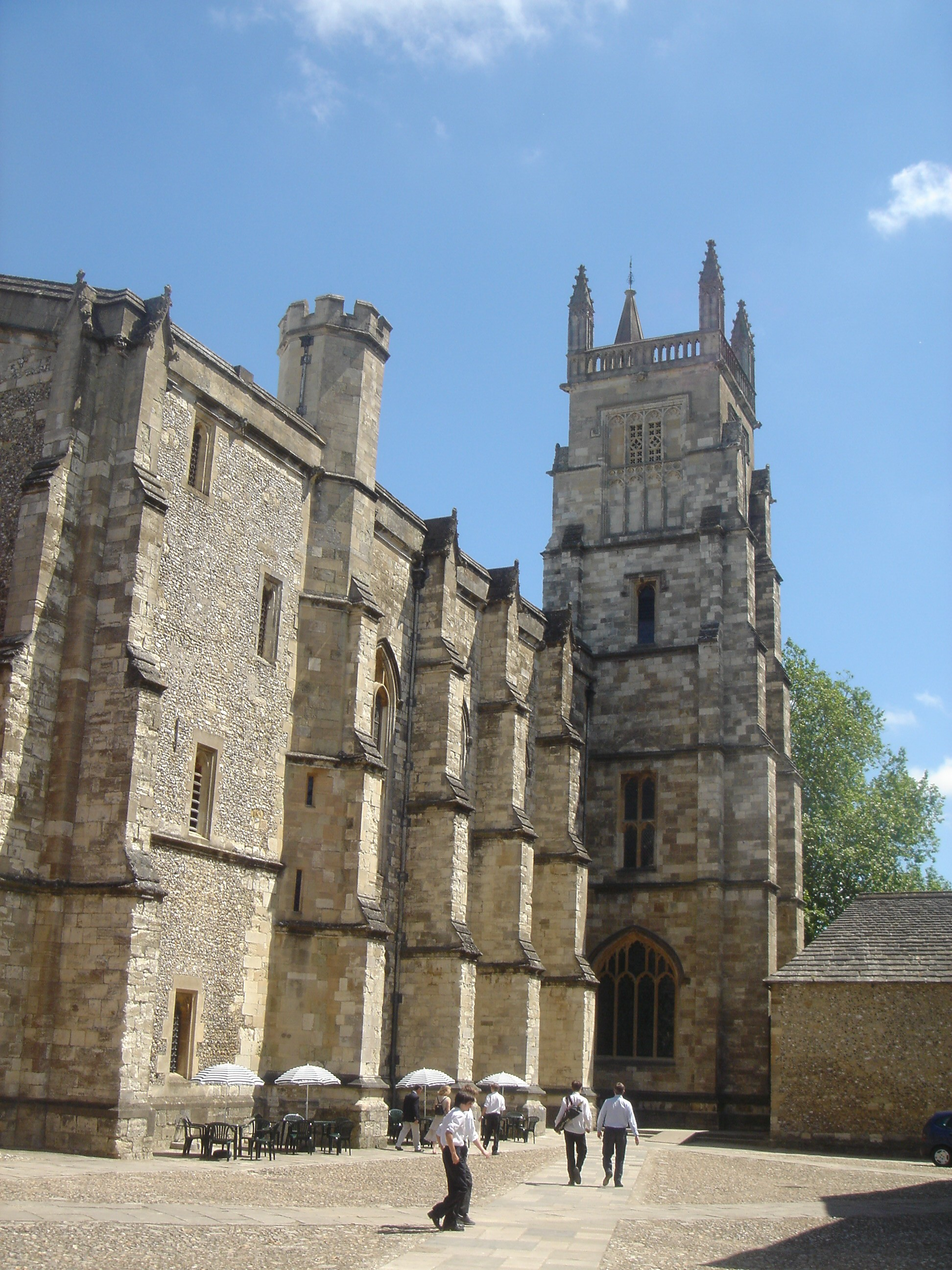
Winchester College

From 1952 to 1957, Gott was educated at Winchester College. Then, from 1958 to 1961, he attended Corpus Christi College, Oxford, as an Exhibitioner, obtaining a B.A. in Modern History.

== Media career ==
After university, Gott worked at the Royal Institute of International Affairs. In the 1960s, he worked at the University of Chile, where he wrote Guerrilla Movements in Latin America. In January 1966, Gott was a candidate in the 1966 Kingston upon Hull North by-election for the Radical Alliance, running on a platform which stressed opposition to the Vietnam War; he polled only 253 votes.

In November 1963, working as a freelance journalist for The Guardian in Cuba, Gott was invited to a celebration of the revolution party at the Soviet Union's embassy in Havana. During the evening, a group of invited journalists who were chatting in the garden were joined by Marxist revolutionary Che Guevara for a few hours, who answered their questions.

In Bolivia in 1967, Gott identified Guevara's dead body after the failure of Guevara's Bolivian campaign. He claimed to be one of the few people in the country who had met Guevara.

In 1981, the BBC's Alasdair Milne and Aubrey Singer sought to appoint Gott to the position of editor of its cultural magazine, The Listener, but did not get the job as Gott failed to obtain security clearance from MI5 since his file was marked. Russell Twisk was appointed instead. Gott was then appointed features editor for The Guardian.

== Contact with KGB ==
In 1994, Gott admitted KGB contacts beginning in 1964 (while working for the Royal Institute of International Affairs), and to having taken Soviet gifts, which he called "red gold". Contact with the KGB resumed in the 1970s under the codename RON, when he accepted Soviet-paid trips to Vienna, Nicosia and Athens, and lunched with Russians. One of his handlers was Igor Titov, who was expelled by the UK in 1983 for "activities incompatible with his diplomatic status".

== Resignation ==
After his period as features editor, Gott became literary editor of The Guardian. He resigned from the latter post in December 1994 after it was alleged in The Spectator that he had been an "agent of influence" for the KGB, claims which he rejected, stating that "Like many other journalists, diplomats and politicians, I lunched with Russians during the cold war". He said that his resignation was "a debt of honour to my paper, not an admission of guilt", because his failure to inform his editor of three trips abroad to meet with KGB officials at their expense had caused embarrassment to the paper during its investigation of Jonathan Aitken.

The source of the allegation that Gott had been an agent was KGB defector Oleg Gordievsky. In his resignation letter, Gott stated: "I took red gold, even if it was only in the form of expenses for myself and my partner. That, in the circumstances, was culpable stupidity, though at the time it seemed more like an enjoyable joke." One issue was whether during the 1980s, the KGB would have thought Gott's information worth £10,000. Phillip Knightley, biographer of the KGB agent Kim Philby, highlighted the limited value of outsider Gott as compared to insider Aldrich Ames; Knightley concluded that Gott would have been lucky to get his bus fare back. Rupert Allason wrote that Gott could have been used as a talent-spotter and to find people who did have highly classified access.

== Death ==
Gott died on 2 November 2025, at the age of 87.

== Selected bibliography ==
=== Books ===
- Gott, Richard; Gilbert, Martin (2000) [1963]. The appeasers. Orion. ISBN 978-1842120507.
- Gott, Richard (1968). A future for the United Nations? (pamphlet). CND.
- Gott, Richard (1970). Guerrilla movements in Latin America. Thomas Nelson.
- Gott, Richard (2000). In the shadow of the liberator: Hugo Chávez and the transformation of Venezuela. London New York: Verso Books. ISBN 9781859843659.
- Gott, Richard (2004). Cuba: a new history. New Haven: Yale University Press. ISBN 9780300104110.
- Gott, Richard (2005). Hugo Chávez and the Bolivarian Revolution. London New York: Verso Books. ISBN 9781844675333.
- Gott, Richard (2011). Britain's Empire: Resistance, Repression and Revolt. Verso Books.

=== Journal articles ===
- Gott, Richard (May–June 2006). "Venezuela's Murdoch". New Left Review. II (39). New Left Review.

Review of Gustavo Cisneros: Un Empresario Global by Pablo Bachelet.
