= Winifred Holtby Academy =

Coordinates: 53.7841°N 0.3202°W

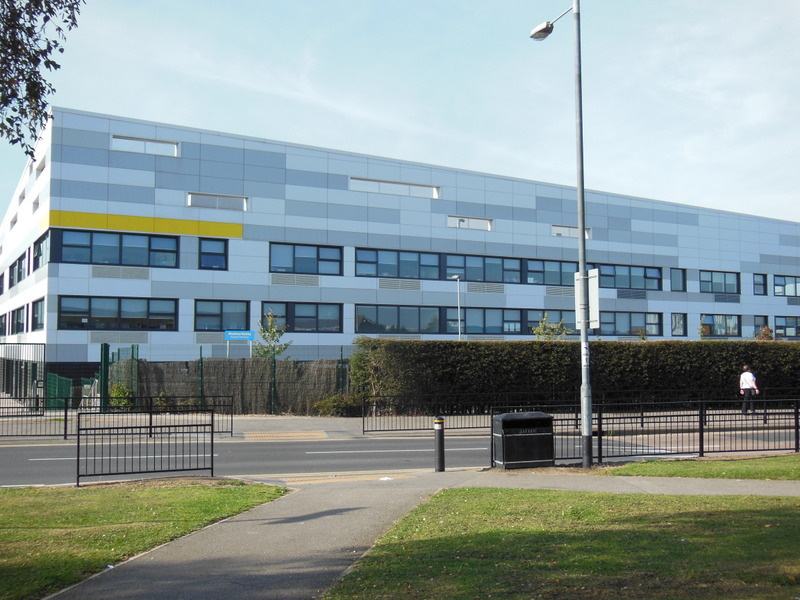

Location
- Midmere Avenue; Leads Road; Bransholme; Kingston upon Hull, East Riding of Yorkshire, HU7 4PW; England

Information
- Type: Academy
- Motto: Aspiration, Achievement, Respect
- Local authority: Hull City Council
- Trust: The Consortium Academy Trust
- Department for Education URN: 139629 Tables
- Ofsted: Reports
- Headteacher: Karen farmer
- Deputy Headteachers: Mr Ian Fernie; Mr pinder
- Assistant Headteachers: Miss Michelle Kermeen; Mr J. Richardson; Mr K. Ziebeck
- Staff: 250+
- Gender: Coeducational
- Age: 11 to 16
- Capacity: 1350
- Houses: Hedoncrofte Riseholme Sefholme Sudtone Wawne
- Colours: Blue and Yellow
- Website: http://www.winifredholtbyacademy.co.uk/

Winifred Holtby Academy (previously Bransholme High School, Winifred Holtby School, Winifred Holtby Technology College) is a coeducational secondary school located in the Bransholme area of Kingston upon Hull in the East Riding of Yorkshire, England. The school is named after Winifred Holtby, a novelist and journalist who is best known for her novel South Riding.

Originally known as Bransholme High School, the school was later renamed Winifred Holtby School, and some time later, Winifred Holtby Technology College. In May 2013 Winifred Holtby School converted to academy status and was renamed Winifred Holtby Academy. The school was given a substantial £38 million rebuild in 2011 under the Building Schools for the Future scheme and was twinned with Tweendykes Special School, who now share a small section of the building, and was opened in September 2011 following a minor delay caused by the collapse of the school's furniture supplier.

In 2019 Winifred Holtby Academy liquidised its own trust and became part of The Consortium Academy Trust.

Winifred Holtby Academy offers GCSEs, BTECs and OCR Nationals as programmes of study for pupils.

== Notable former pupils ==
=== Bransholme High School ===
- Karl Turner, politician
- Kirk Yeaman, professional Rugby League player for Hull F.C.
- Richard Horne, professional Rugby League player for Hull F.C.
- Lee Jackson, professional Rugby League player for Hull F.C. and Sheffield Eagles; fastest try-scorer in either codes of rugby
- Danny Houghton, Captain of Hull F.C.
- Joe Cator, professional Rugby League player for Hull F.C.

== Notable former staff ==
- Gerald Dunn, rugby player
