= Independent Nuclear Disarmament Election Committee =

The Independent Nuclear Disarmament Election Committee (INDEC) was a splinter group of the Campaign for Nuclear Disarmament (CND) in the United Kingdom. It was founded in April 1962 by CND members including Pat Arrowsmith and Vanessa Redgrave. The group stood candidates in the 1964 general election in Bromley and Twickenham, but achieved a mere 1,534 votes.

The following year, Arrowsmith re-emerged with the Radical Alliance. Again they stood in elections, but won only 163 votes in the 1966 United Kingdom general election, although Richard Gott did win 253 votes for the party in the prior Kingston upon Hull North by-election. The group appears to have then been dissolved.
