= Bransholme =

Housing estate in Kingston upon Hull, England

Coordinates: 53.78297°N 0.32451°W

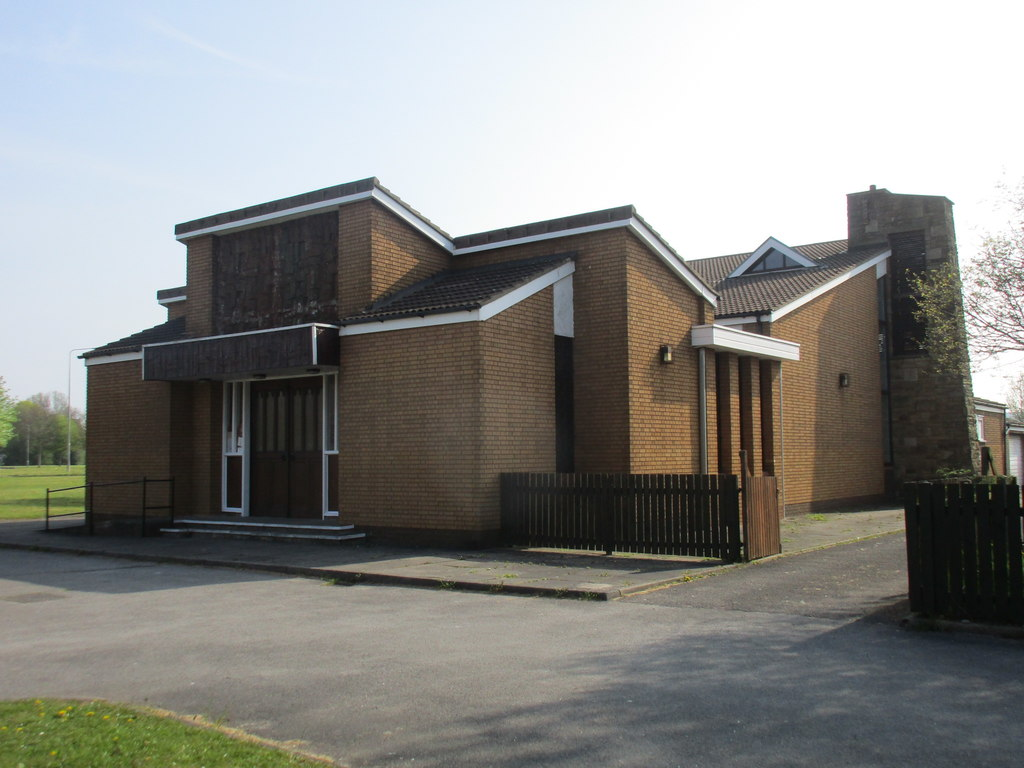
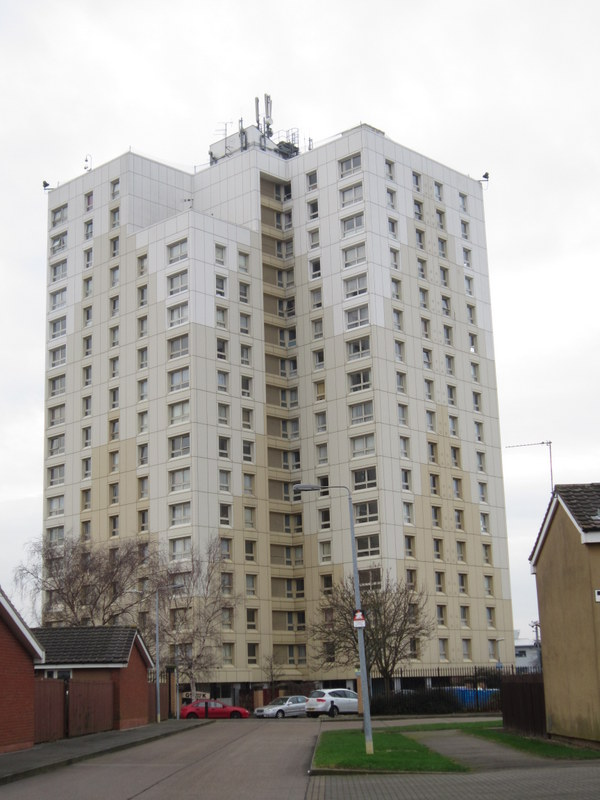
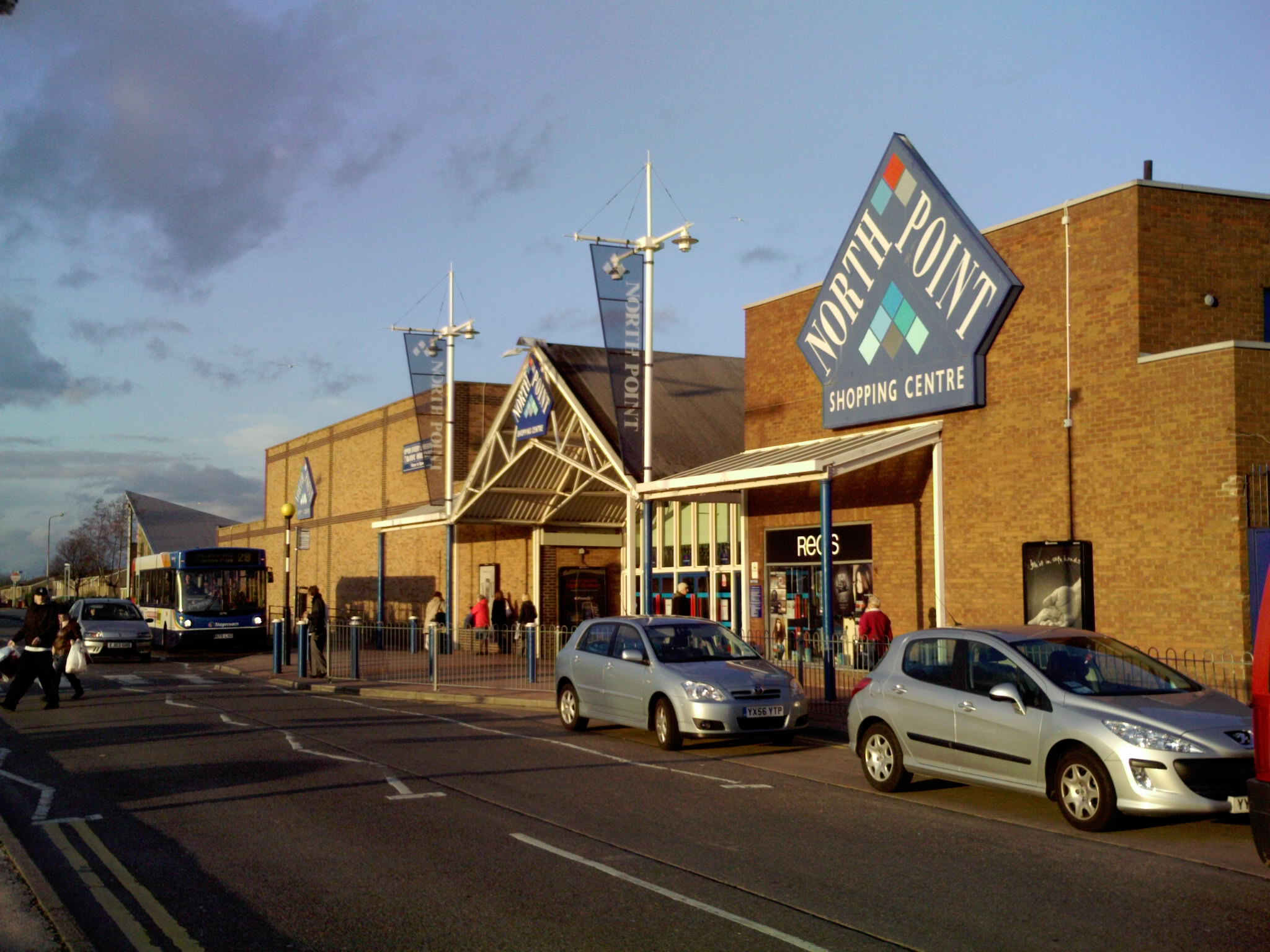
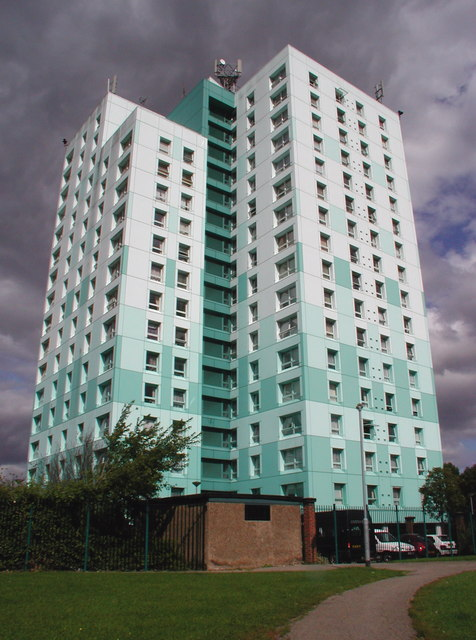
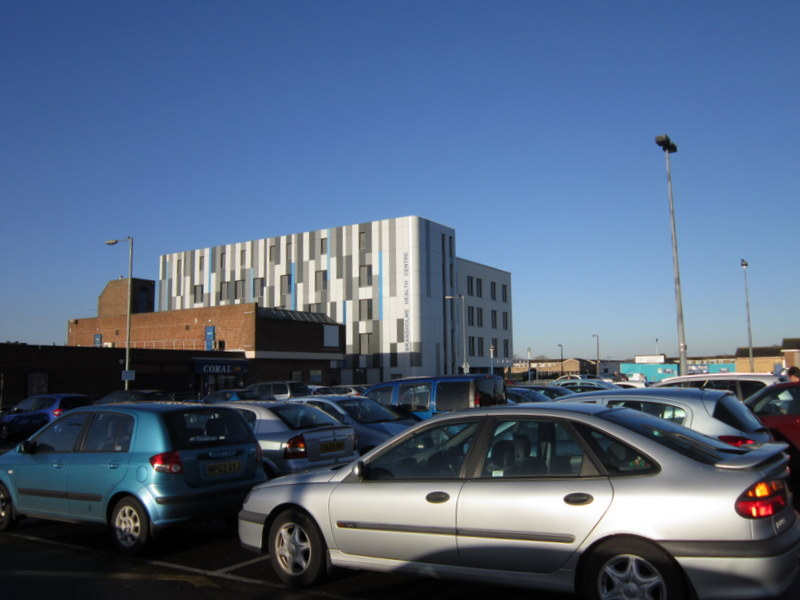
- Church of St Mary Gatwick House North Point Shopping Centre Padstow House Health Centre

- Location within the East Riding of Yorkshire
- Population: 18,533
- OS grid reference: TA105335
- Unitary authority: Kingston upon Hull
- Ceremonial county: East Riding of Yorkshire
- Region: Yorkshire and the Humber
- Country: England
- Sovereign state: United Kingdom
- Post town: HULL
- Postcode district: HU7
- Dialling code: 01482
- Police: Humberside
- Fire: Humberside
- Ambulance: Yorkshire
- UK Parliament: Kingston upon Hull North and Cottingham

Bransholme is an area and a housing estate on the north side of Kingston upon Hull, East Riding of Yorkshire, England. The name Bransholme comes from an old Scandinavian word meaning Brand's water meadow (brand or brandt meant 'wild boar').

The largely council owned estate is located in between Sutton-on-Hull to the east, Sutton Park to the south, and Kingswood to the west. It is surrounded by fields and 'A' Roads which largely isolate it from the rest of East Hull.

There are two high, or secondary schools, Winifred Holtby Academy and Kingswood Academy, within the environs of Bransholme, these are fed by a number of primary schools.

There are two major retail centres available within the area. These are North Point Shopping Centre, formerly and still locally known as Bransholme Centre, a location where a number of smaller shops can be found as well as a covered market, and Kingswood Retail Park, which is the site of a number of large major stores as well as an entertainment area including a multiscreen cinema, bowling alley and restaurants. At the 2011 census, Bransholme was made up of the Bransholme East and West Wards and the combined population was 18,533. (Note: The population of the East Ward is 10,330 and the West Ward is 8,203. The two citations following are the sum of the two wards.)

== History ==
Bransholme history goes at least as far back as the Domesday Book of 1086 where Bransholme is marked as a little hill surrounded by water. At this time, the settlement known as Sudtone (now Sutton) occupied a strip of high ground forming a connecting link between Wagene (later Waghen then Wawne). An ancient highway ran through Wagene across Sudtone and through to Bilton.

Some time in the second half of the 2nd century, a Romano-British farming settlement stood on the site of the former Gibraltar Farm near where the new bridge crosses the River Hull. Also, a medieval stone dwelling house and two timber buildings existed where Foredyke Drain met the River Hull.

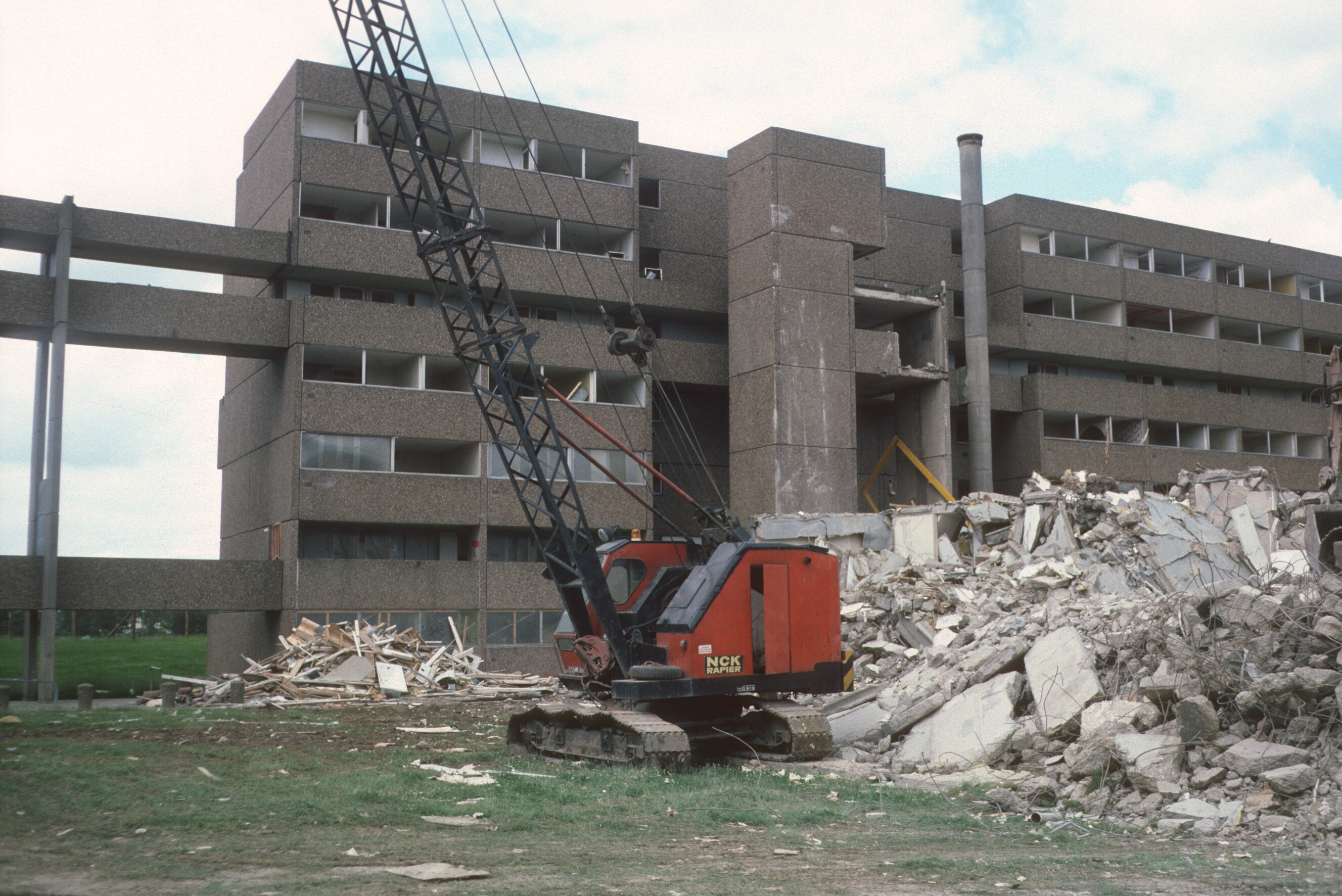
The Bransholme Maisonettes being demolished in 1987. These were of a shared design with the Leek Street Flats in Leeds.

A Roman camp was established to the north of Waghen. When the Angles and Saxons invaded they farmed land on the high ridge that ran from the village to Sutton. The ridge was surrounded by waters and marshland which at high tide separated Waghen from Sudtone. Later, the monks and the Lords of the Manor drained the land with a series of drains and dikes.

In June 1939, more than 80 acres (32 ha) of land were requisitioned to build a Barrage Balloon defence station. Originally designated as RAF 17 Balloon Centre it was opened on 28 June 1939 and was from where, during the Second World War, the Balloon Barrage in the defence of Kingston upon Hull with its vital docks and rail network, was controlled and maintained. By September 1942, over 2,000 Royal Air Force and Women's Auxiliary Air Force served there. On 15 October 1942, the station was renamed RAF Sutton on Hull. It became the home of the RAF School of Fire Fighting and Rescue from 1943–59. The RAF Station was finally disposed of on Monday 14 August 1961.

After the Second World War, when large areas of Hull lay devastated due to enemy bombing, it was clearly necessary to rehouse on a massive scale. Urban renewal prompted the City Council to enforce the Acquisition of Land Act of 1946. The City Council already owned large areas in Bransholme. By January 1948, it had obtained four more farms. The intention of the Council at the time was to provide a new town at Bransholme rather than a large estate, but government approval was not forthcoming.

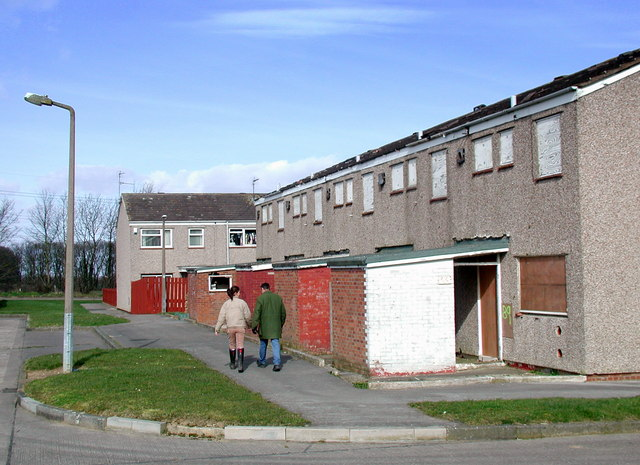
Housing in North Bransholme

The Bransholme Estate was originally planned to have a population of 26,000 but now has a population of over 30,000. It was built mainly in the late 1960s and early 1970s. Bransholme Housing Estate was originally known as 'north of Sutton Road' or 'The Wawne Estate' until the current name was chosen in 1966 from a list including Soffham, Meaux, Marvelton and Midmere Dales. The first houses were officially opened on 1 May 1967 by Lord Mayor Alderman RW Buckle. The first Bransholme tenants were housed in Dulverton Close.

In 1968, Noddle Hill Farm was demolished to make way for the building of Bransholme Estate. The houses in Midmere Avenue and Dorchester Road were built between 1971 and 1976. Kestrel Avenue was built in about 1981. Bransholme is widely believed to be largest council estate in Europe, but Susanna O'Neill says in her book, The Hull Book of Days, that The Becontree estate in Dagenham is larger, although she concedes that Bransholme is probably the largest estate in Yorkshire.

The early years were not easy. Some newcomers loved living in Bransholme, but as early as 1971, condensation was causing severe problems in over 1,000 houses, and Securicor had to be employed to combat vandalism. Two years later, it was trouble with the maisonettes, and the growing realisation that there were too few schools.

Now, schools and churches offer much in terms of education and social and spiritual welfare. Winifred Holtby high school (formerly Bransholme High), named after the novelist and journalist, had technology college status for ten years from 1999, and is now an academy. The very latest in technology, libraries, medical and community services are in existence, and numerous adult learning and leisure centres are available.

== Housing ==
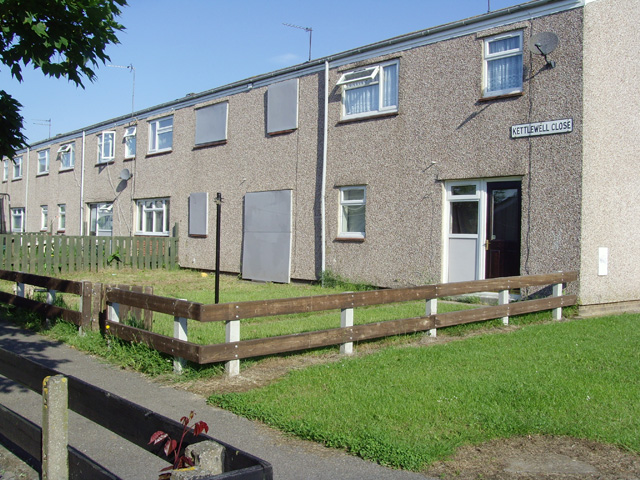
Houses on Kettlewell Close

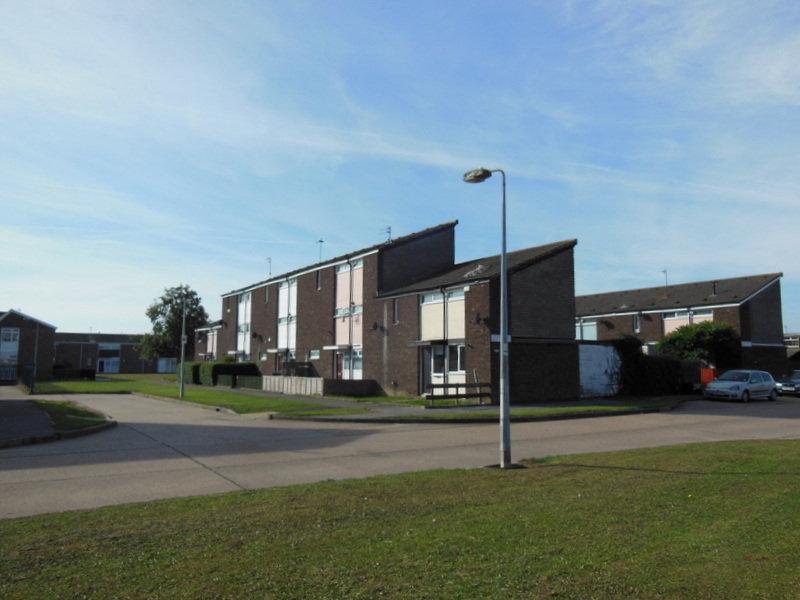
Houses on Stroud Crescent West

Most housing in Bransholme is prefabricated terrace housing, and there are also two blocks of high rise flats on the estate (Padstow House (pictured) and Gatwick House (above)), as well as newer housing on the outskirts. Unusually during the construction of the estate, most of the houses predating the estate were left (mostly along Wawne Road) and the occasional older house will stand on a road amongst many of the estates other 'identikit' houses.

A growing number of the houses are now boarded up, in particular the bungalows which were intended for occupation by the estate's older residents. The quality of the houses on the estate has been in question ever since their construction. Many of the houses have only small windows on the front, being small horizontal slits and, although these have proved efficient in maintaining security, many residents have complained their houses lack light and are unpleasant to live in. The houses have had condensation problems and the heating systems have often been described as being inadequate.

In recent years, Skilgate Close and Selworthy Close have been demolished, leaving large amounts of open space in the centre of Bransholme, with some of the largest space being the adjacent former site of the 'Alcatraz' maisonettes. Extensive refurbishment works relating to heating systems, kitchens, bathrooms, electrical rewires and thermal comfort (cavity and loft insulation) commenced in 2006 by Hull City Council to bring the housing stock up to the Decent Homes Standard. The programme of works is expected to be completed by March 2011.

=== North Bransholme ===
In 2010 ownership and management of council housing in North Bransholme was transferred to a housing association, the Riverside Group. This involved 1,175 properties.

== Amenities ==
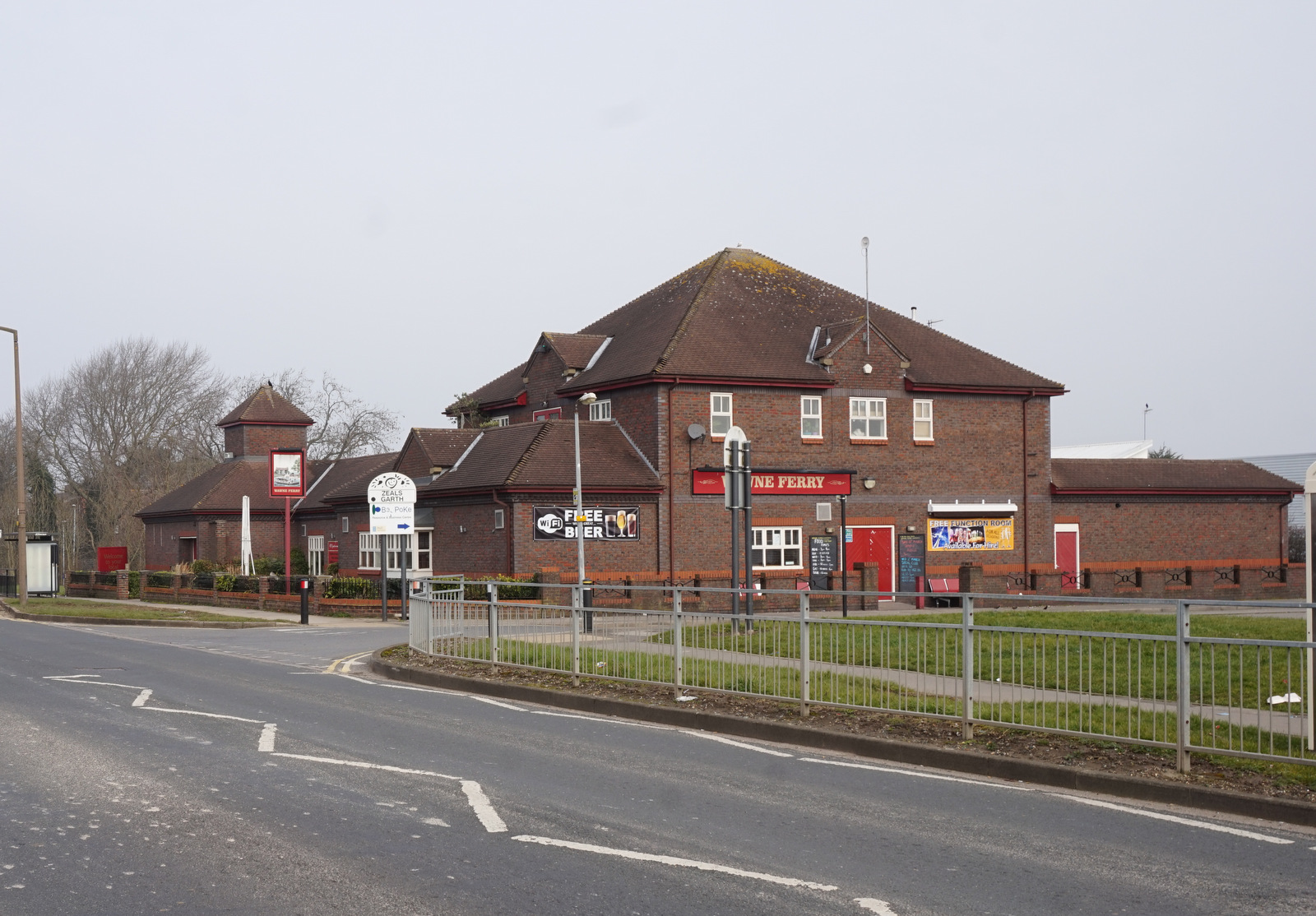
Wawne Ferry Public House

Adjacent to the North Point shopping centre are a library, a health centre, and a police station. Next to the police station is a building formerly used as an NSPCC branch but now used as the Astra Youth Centre.

The health centre's original building had been there since the late 1960s/early 1970s. It is located in Bransholme West Ward, which this scheme is to be sited, is the 8th most deprived in Hull.

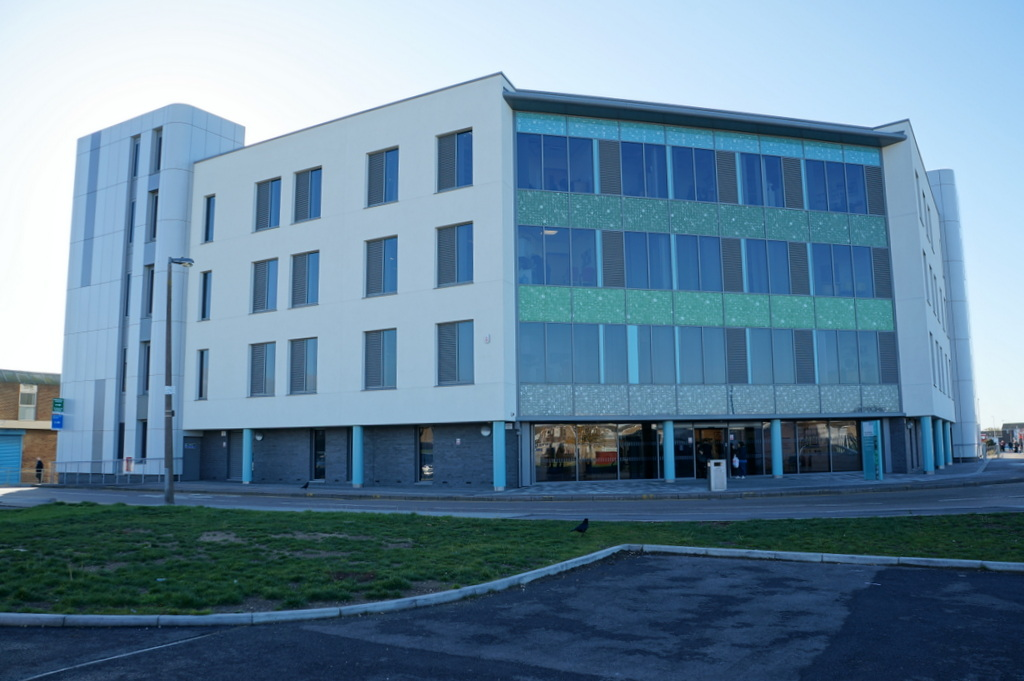
Bransholme Health Centre

A new NHS health centre was built and opened in 2012, also replacing the existing council office at North Point.

According to a report by Hull NHS PCT when this new facility was proposed they said "The catchment area for the proposed facility also covers Bransholme East, which is the 6th most deprived in a City, which itself is the 11th most deprived of the 354 local authorities in England."

The Hull NHS PCT said the following in a report: "All services currently provided for will continue in the new facility, alongside additional provision to meet the health needs of the community. A discreet, predominantly paediatric audiology and speech and language therapies area will enable a greater number of patients to be seen in appropriate accommodation. Multi-functional space is provided for group clinical and non-clinical services, such as group smoking cessation classes and baby clinics. The space will be able to be secured from other areas of the building to provide useful community spaces, with their own toilets and drink preparation areas."

There are a number of parks, playgrounds and sports facilities. Heartland's park (near the middle of the area) was opened in August 2000 on the site of former maisonettes, as a grassed area with trees and an adventure playground. Ings Road Playing Fields have sporting facilities plus grassed area and woodland. Noddle Hill Way has a fishing lake and wildlife wetland, as well as football pitches and community woodland. Bude Park playing fields has a children's playground, which was refurbished in 2010 after major vandalism.

== North Point Shopping Centre ==
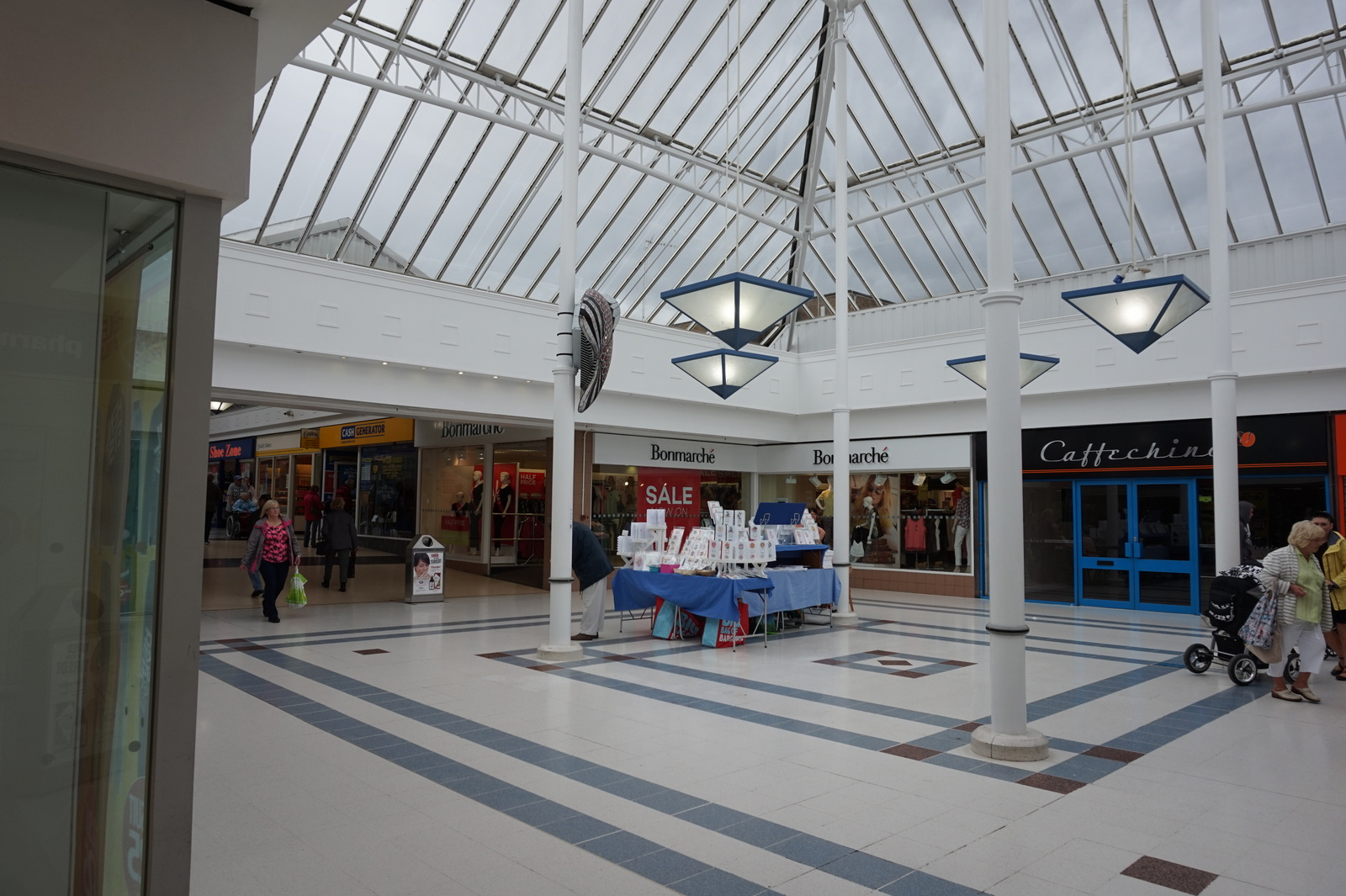
The interior of the North Point Centre

The North Point Shopping Centre is the main shopping centre in the Bransholme area. It is still often referred to by its former name, the Bransholme Centre and was opened in the early 1970s. The first store to sign for the Centre was Boyes who still trade from the same store today.

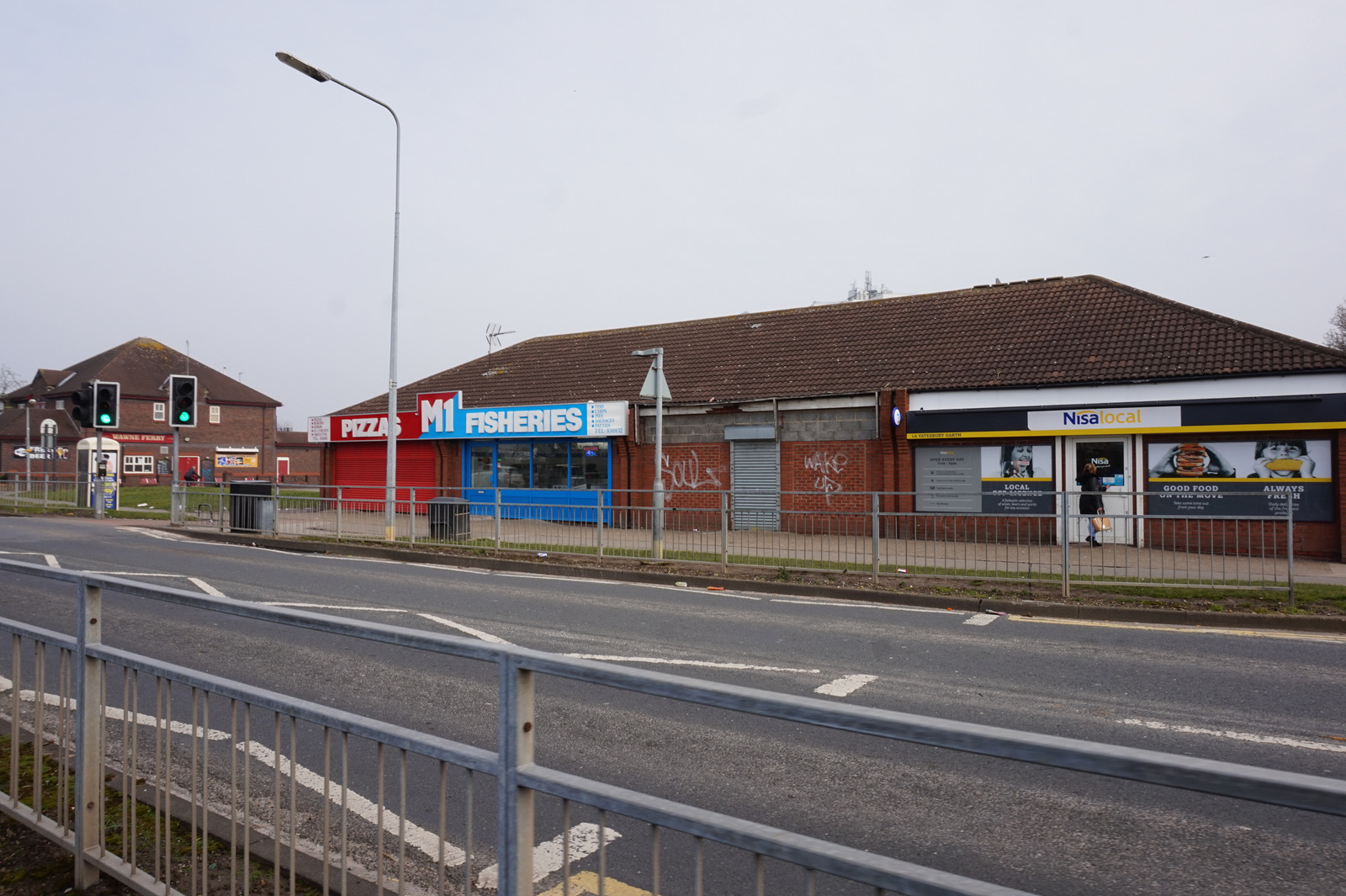
Yatesbury Shops on Wawne Road

There is a health centre next to the site, the original Health Centre dated back from the 1960s/early 70s and was of the distinctive single-storey flat roofed design. A new health centre was constructed, it opened in 2012, which also replaced dental services previously at the old health centre building. The centre is also a bus terminus for the many routes operated by Stagecoach in Hull serving the surrounding area. There were two banks in the shopping centre but, Yorkshire Bank closed in September 2014, leaving only Halifax. North Point Shopping Centre also has 3 pharmacies located inside the shopping centre, with the latest addition being Bransholme Pharmacy. Bransholme pharmacy was previously known as Lloyds Pharmacy before being sold to an independent group called Roshban.

== Schools ==
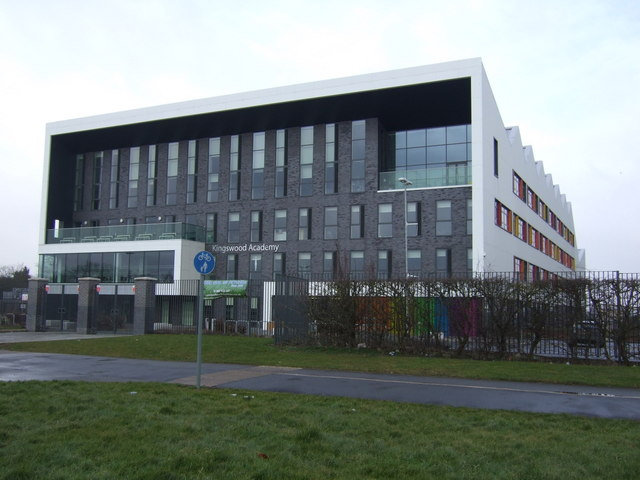
Kingswood Academy

There are seven primary schools in Bransholme, and two secondary schools, Winifred Holtby Academy (formerly Bransholme High School) and Kingswood Academy (formerly Perronet Thompson School). There are no further education establishments on the estate, the nearest being Wilberforce College.

== See also ==
- Kingswood, Kingston upon Hull, privately constructed estate adjacent to the north, built 1990s onwards
- Bransholme water works
- Large council estates in the UK
- List of areas in Kingston upon Hull
