= Kingswood Academy, Hull =

Academy in Kingston upon Hull, East Riding of Yorkshire, England

Kingswood Academy
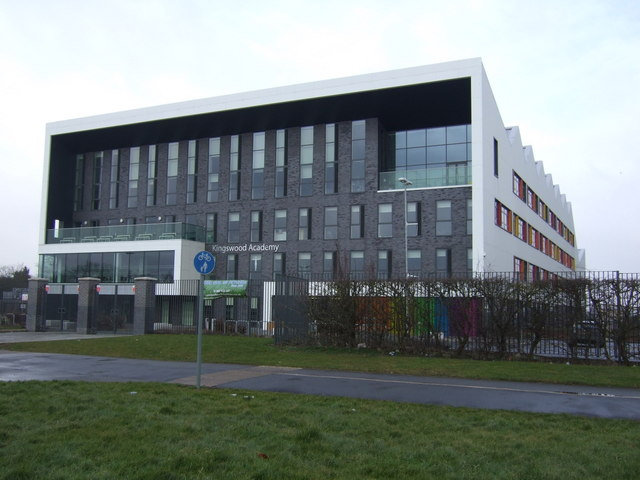
- Kingswood Academy (opened 2013)

Location
- Wawne Road; Kingston upon Hull, East Riding of Yorkshire, HU7 4WR; England
- Coordinates: 53.79836°N 0.32618°W

Information
- Type: Academy
- Established: 1988 (Former), 2013 (New)
- Trust: Academies Enterprise Trust
- Department for Education URN: 139118 Tables
- Ofsted: Reports
- Chair: Tony Clark
- Head: Richard Westoby
- Age: 11 to 16
- Website: www.thekingswoodacademy.org
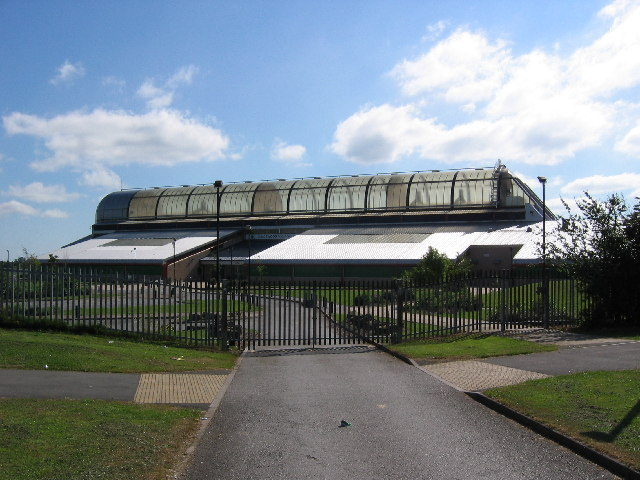
- Perronet Thompson (opened 1988)

Kingswood Academy is a secondary school on the northern fringe of the Bransholme housing estate in Kingston upon Hull, England.

The school opened in 2013, it was built as part of the Building Schools for the Future programme as a replacement on the same site for the Perronet Thompson School, (later known as Kingswood College of Arts) which originally opened in 1988.

== History and design ==
Design of the Perronet Thompson School began in 1984 by the architects department of Humberside County Council. Construction began in 1986, with John Laing as the main contractor. The school had a non-conventional design designed to maximise heat efficiency, with a central atrium illuminated by a barrel vault. The school opened 1988. In 1999 the school was closed due to poor performance. It was reopened and renamed Kingswood High School, receiving funding under the government's Fresh Start programme to specialise as an Arts College.

In 2011 Hull City Council decided to demolish the school, and rebuild it with better facilities as part of the Building Schools for the Future programme. This programme saw 17 new schools built in Hull, including Kingswood Academy, at a cost of £123 million.

Construction of the new 1,350 pupil capacity school began in April 2011, with a stated construction cost of around £25 million. The school was designed by Allford Hall Monaghan Morris, and built by the "Esteem Consortium" with Morgan Sindall as the main construction contractor. Initially planned to open in September 2012, opening was delayed to January 2013. On completion of the new building the school changed its name to Kingswood Academy. The new school building opened in January 2013.

When the Academy opened as an Academies Enterprise Trust academy, free school uniforms were distributed in order to improve the image of the academy and its pupils in the local community.

In 2009 1,067 pupils were enrolled at the school; in 2012 the number had dropped to 797 students.

Dale Jackson replaced Bob Dore as principal in 2015. As of 2016 the academy had 588 pupils.

== See also ==
- Thomas Perronet Thompson, Hull-born parliamentarian
- Kingswood, Kingston upon Hull, housing estate
