= Kingswood, Kingston upon Hull =

Housing estate in East Riding of Yorkshire, England

Kingswood
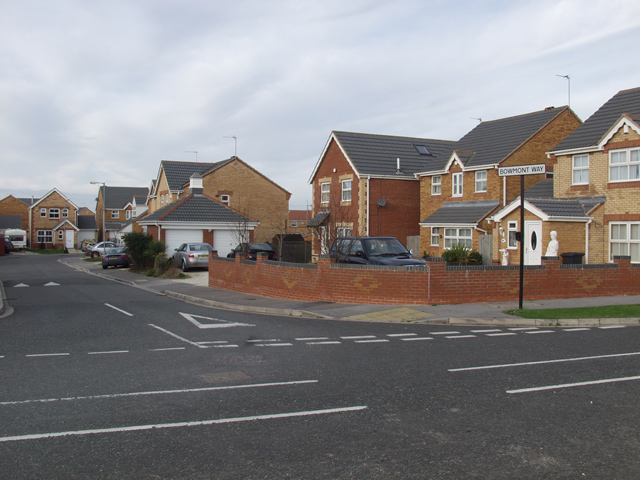
- Typical Kesteven estate housing, Bowmont Way (2008)

- Location within the East Riding of Yorkshire
- Unitary authority: Kingston upon Hull
- Ceremonial county: East Riding of Yorkshire
- Region: Yorkshire and the Humber
- Country: England
- Sovereign state: United Kingdom
- Post town: HULL
- Postcode district: HU7
- Dialling code: 01482
- Police: Humberside
- Fire: Humberside
- Ambulance: Yorkshire

Kingswood, occasionally referred to as Kingswood Parks, is a modern housing estate on the northern fringe of Kingston upon Hull, in the ceremonial county of the East Riding of Yorkshire, England.

Through much of its history much of the area has been marsh – some drainage was made during the medieval period – a canal, the Forthdyk (later Foredike) was cut in the 13th century. The Engine Drain was cut c. 1675, with windmills aiding drainage of the area. In the 1770s construction of the Holderness Drain incorporated part of the Foredike into its route, and further improved drainage in the wider area. After drainage to the later 20th century the land use was exclusively agricultural.

The estate was developed from the 1990s onwards on low lying agricultural land lying immediately east of the River Hull, and adjacent to the Bransholme Estate to the south-east, separated by the A1033 and Wawne Road. In addition to the housing the area includes a large shopping area, Kingswood retail park, including an Asda superstore and several other warehouse type shopping outlets, plus leisure facilities including a cinema, indoor bowling, and several fast food restaurants.

== Geography ==
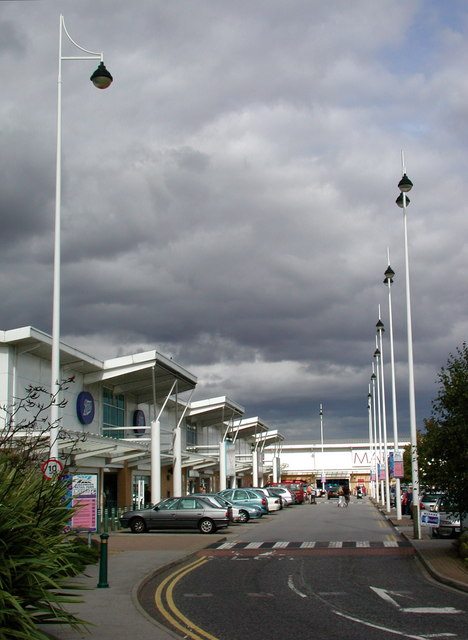
Kingswood Retail Park (2007)

The Kingswood's area boundaries are the River Hull to the west, the Wawne Road to the east, and the Wawne Drain and Foredyke Stream to the south; the northern boundary can be taken to be the boundary between the City of Kingston upon Hull and the civil parish of Wawne. (Note: These boundaries closely correspond to those given as the scope of the Area Action Plan (AAP) for Kingswood by Hull City Council in 2015. Bude Park, an open space south of the Wawne Drain was added to the formal AAP to be included in the consultation.) The western side of the new development (beyond Engine Drain), is sometimes referred to as Kingswood Parks. (Note: Developed by the Kingswood Parks Development Company Limited.) (Note: 53.799949°N 0.357795°W, Kingswood Park (housing))

The route of the Engine Drain passes through the estate, (Note: 53.804072°N 0.347088°W, Engine Drain (approximate centre)) (Note: The Engine Drain is also recorded on maps as the West Drain.) roughly north-south, and has created a clear boundary between parts of the housing development. (Note: Developed as and named the Engine Drain Greenway with the drain and area used to both store and drain surface water. (As of 2015) The southern section had been culverted, with the upper area left as wetland.) Green spaces include an undeveloped area of former farmland, Midmeredales, (Note: 53.797294°N 0.338100°W, Midmeredales) (Note: As of 2015 the area roughly corresponding to the fields at Midmeredales have been developed as a grassland, with tree planting, and renamed "Wilberforce Wood"/"Foredyke Green".) located along the north side of the Wawne Drain; (Note: 53.797361°N 0.334370°W, Wawne Drain (site of)) and the wood, Ings Plantation, (Note: 53.799253°N 0.353124°W, Ings plantation) the boundaries of which date to at least the 1850s, is retained within the modern development.

As well as the Wawne Drain and Foredyke Stream drain at the southern boundary, which are closely paralleled by the John Newton way/Bude Road on the eastern half, there are several large-scale man+made features at the edges of the estate: the easternmost end of the A1033, named Raich Carter Way, connects to west Hull and Beverley via the Ennerdale Link Bridges; in the south-western corner, just outside the retail park area is a large water storage area, (Note: 53.790322°N 0.353058°W, Water storage lagoon) and a former sewage works, now the site of Bransholme Surface Water Pumping Station. (Note: 53.790158°N 0.350862°W, Bransholme pumping station)

Most of the area is under 5 metres (16 ft) above sea level, though to the east the land rises to up to or over 10 metres (33 ft). The Kingswood area is vulnerable to floods under certain conditions: overtopping of the River Hull; flooding from water from the Holderness Drain or other local land drains; or flooding from local surface water. In the long term the area may be affected by sea level rise. Almost all parts of Kingswood excluding those parts in the east at higher ground are in a Flood Zone risk 3a.iii (high hazard) area. (Note: Areas designated as 3a.iii are those which have a risk of threat to life if flood defences fail.)

In 2011 Kingswood's population was 5,314, more than 95% of whom were white, and the employment rate was 67%, close to the national and regional averages (70, 68%) (2011 Census).

== History ==
=== Background ===
From the prehistoric period to the medieval ages the land in Holderness east of the River Hull was predominately marshland, excluding local rises in the land were villages were established. The southern part was subject to inundation from the sea as a result of tides, and was brackish; whilst the northern part was still swampy but freshwater; the transition between the two was around Wawne at the furthest tidal reach of the River Hull. Whilst most of the area was within the flood plain, the eastern parts rise to a peak in the north-eastern of up to 10 metres (33 ft) above sea level – the higher areas are glacial till. No evidence has been found (1995) of human activity in the area during the prehistoric period, though finds from the period have been found nearby at Sutton, Wawne and in west Hull. Extensive pottery and other finds from the Romano-British period and evidence of ditches have been found nearby on the west bank of the River Hull, showing that there was a settlement.

In the medieval period flood defences allowing the improvement of land were first made in the wider area, including banks preventing flooding and dikes to drain the marshes; additionally due to the lack of roads navigational cuts were also made to allow boats to travel to inhabited places in the marshes which also sometimes functioned as drains. The drain known as the Forthdyk (now Foredike Stream) was first cut in the early 13th century. (Note: The Foredike (also Forthdike, Forthdyk, Fordyk etc) was cut c. 1221–1235 under the King's bailiff Sayer the Second (Lord Saierus of Sutton) and Peter de Waghen – on agreement with the monks of the Abbey of Meaux and other local tenants and landholders it formed the boundary between the manors or parishes of Wawne and Sutton. An earlier drain of the same name is mentioned in the Meaux Chronicle.) The drain's primary function is thought to have been as a waterway, though it drained Wagne (Wawne), Sutton, Bransholme, and Swine. It was 16 by 6 feet (4.9 by 1.8 m) wide by deep, with two bridges, built to allow boats to travel along its length; one near the river, the other across the Wawne Road, (Note: 53.799187°N 0.329083°W, Foredyke bridge (Wawne Road)) At the river bank a watermill was made by the monks of Meaux which was driven by differences in height of water between river and drain at both low and high tides. In order to maintain the Foredike as a waterway a second parallel dike was cut, Sutton-dyk. At the river end of these waterways there was a mill pond also used as a fish pond. (Note: The location of the mill and fish ponds was close to the place recorded as Fishouse Vaccary on the 1850s OS map.) Archaeological and documentary evidence indicates human activity in the medieval period was focused in the south-west corner of the area, near the medieval mill; the physical evidence includes earthworks and pottery finds.

In c. 1675 the Engine Drain was cut for drainage, emptying into the River Hull somewhere near the original Foredike outlet; windmills were built to power the draining. (Note: Three windmills are marked on a 1773 estate map – their locations are roughly matched by indicative symbols on a 1764 map of drains in Holderness.) In 1764 land to the east of the River Hull was permitted to be further improved by drainage by an act of Parliament, the Holderness Drainage Act 1764 (4 Geo. 3. c 47 Pr.). The work carried out included the cutting of the original path of the Holderness Drain, as well as 17 miles (27 km) embankment of the east bank of the River Hull to prevent flooding. Much of the work had been completed by 1772 at a cost of £24,000. Further work was carried out on the draining of the river valley, the second phase from 1787–1805 at a cost of £16,000. (Note: Part of the Foredike canal was later named Wawne Drain. The 1764 drainage act diverted the Foredike from its outfall in the parish of Wawne to a cut passing south through the parish of Sutton, with the fork at Fore Dike Clough. (Note: 53.798351°N 0.331574°W, Foredyke clough (junction of Foredyke and Wawne drains)) On the 1850s OS map the Wawne Drain ran approximately west-south-west towards the river, continuing the line of the Foredike, to Roe bank near Fish House Vaccary. In modern times 2006 parts of both drains still exist – the Wawne/Foredike Drain, now closely parallel with John Newton Way/Bude Road now forms the boundary between the Kingswood and Bransholme estates. (Excluding the newer North Bransholme estate constructed on the east side of the Wawne Road to the north of the drain.)) (Note: 53.800512°N 0.324607°W, Foredyke Stream (drain))

In 1850 the land on which Kingswood would be developed consisted of roughly rectangular enclosed fields, with extensive drainage. The only recorded structures were two farms, Ings Farm and Gibraltar, both near the bank of the River Hull; another farm, South Field was on the east side of the Wawne-Sutton road; there were no roads inside the area, except the short Midmeredales Lane, branching west at South Field for around 1,000 feet (300 m); farm tracks from the lane led to the two river bank farmsteads. On the Ordnance Survey map the general area was labelled as The Ings (see Ings), (Note: Fields or sub-areas were named Grey Legs, Fish House Vaccary, Midmeredales, and The Sixties; the area called South Field included fields on either side of the Wawne Road.) The only woodland was a small plantation, Ings Plantation. This pattern of use and development remained completely unchanged for the next 100 years.

In 1968 part of the parish of Wawne was transferred to the city of Hull. Gibraltar farm was demolished by the beginning of the 1970s, by which time the Bransholme Housing Estate had begun to be developed to the south of the Wawne/Foredike Drain, with a large sewage works (see Bransholme water works) established on the south side of the Wawne Drain, adjacent to the River Hull. In the 1970s the estate was extended north of the Foredike into the (former) parish of Wawne, along the east side of the Wawne Road. (Note: 53.804164°N 0.329463°W, North Bransholme) Development of the Bransholme estate continued to 1983 with around 9,000 houses built. The first building within the future 'Kingswood' area was Broadacre County Primary School west of Wawne Road in the late 1980s. (Note: 53.802900°N 0.338393°W, Broadacre primary school)

=== Kingswood estate ===
Initial development at Kingswood took place in an ad hoc way around Kesteven Way, (Note: 53.800657°N 0.338918°W, Kesteven Way estate) essentially as an extension of northern Bransholme west of the Wawne Road (c. 1980s). In 1989 Hull City Council and estate developers agreed to jointly develop the land west of the Wawne Road, north of the Foredike/Wawne Drain, and east of the River Hull. Planning permission for this large development was given in December 1994 -development of the entire area was expected to take 15 to 20 years. The development area was around 320 hectares (790 acres) in size of which 170 hectares (420 acres) was allotted to housing, 50 hectares (120 acres) to employment, and 100 hectares (250 acres) to shopping, civic buildings and greenspaces.

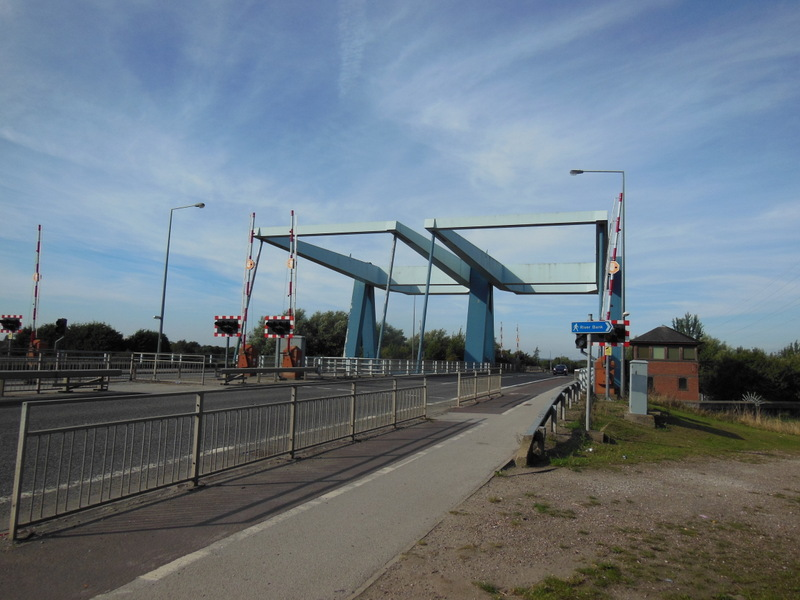
Ennerdale Link Bridges and (A1033) Raich Carter Way (2013)

A key event in the development of Kingswood was the construction of the Ennerdale Link Bridges over the River Hull in 1997. (Note: 53.793900°N 0.359125°W, Ennerdale Link Bridges) Work on the link began in the early 1990s, with the crossing originally planned to be a tunnel, difficult ground conditions forced a change of plan in 1994, resulting in the construction of two bridges. The new crossing allowed the Raich Carter Way (A1033) to connect to the main Hull to Beverley road to the west (A1079 and A1174).

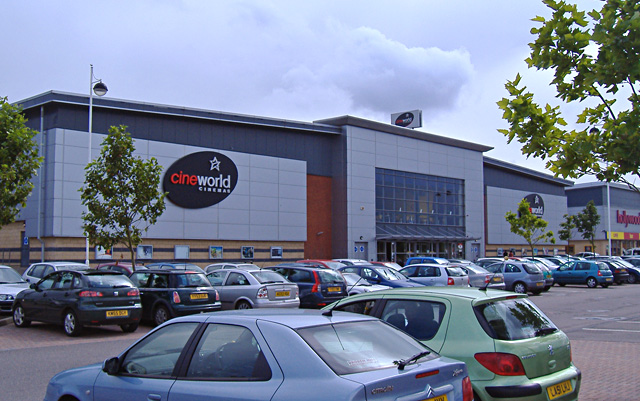
Cineworld Cinema multiplex (2007)

By 2003 considerable development had taken place; within the four regions within Kingswood (defined by land use) the developments were: at Kingswood Retail Park, (Note: 53.794728°N 0.347349°W, Kingswood retail park) the development was complete – an Asda superstore had been built (1996), and Matalan, Boots, and Comet had established stores (2001); at Kingswood Leisure Park a David Lloyd Leisure facility (1999), (Note: 53.792952°N 0.357828°W, David Lloyd leisure centre) a UGC cinema (2000), (Note: 53.791417°N 0.353434°W, Cinema) a Hollywood Bowl bowling centre (2003), (Note: 53.791103°N 0.354477°W, Hollywood Bowl indoor ten pin bowling) and food and pub facilities had been opened, with 2.5 hectares (6.2 acres) undeveloped; at the 45 hectares (110 acres) Kingswood Business Park work had commenced but not been completed on around a quarter of the site; (Note: 53.795374°N 0.357686°W, Kingswood business park (industrial/warehousing)) and at the housing estate proper around 400 houses had been built, in addition to the approximate 1,000 houses around Kesteven Way. The Hull City Plan (2000) expected that the development when complete would house around 12,000 people in 5,000 houses, with the area providing around 4,000 jobs in manufacturing and services.

In 2007 some parts of Kingswood were flooded (see also 2007 United Kingdom floods) – these were those constructed under the 1994 planning permissions; houses constructed under the 2004 permissions were not flooded internally due to the flood mitigations required by the 2004 planning requirements. The primary cause of the flood was a breakdown at the Bransholme Pumping Station.

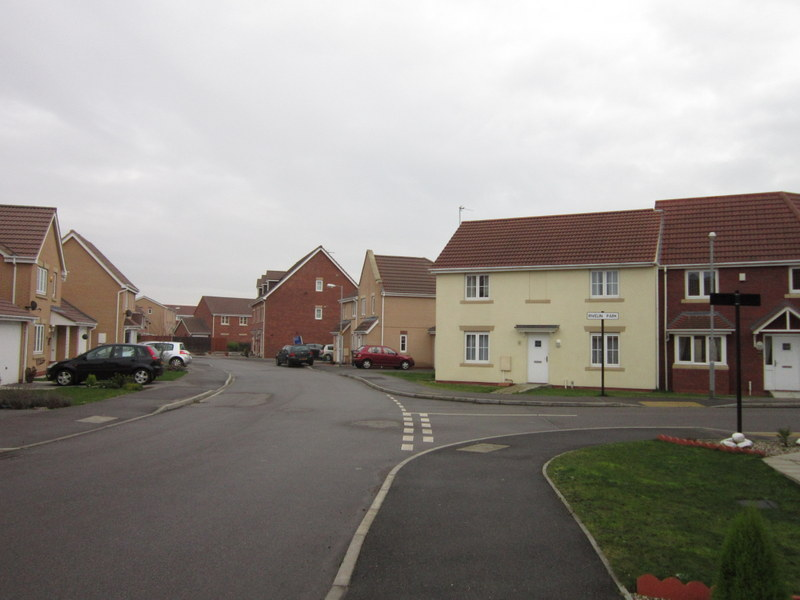
Typical housing in Kingswood Parks west of the Engine Drain (2013)

By 2011 a total of around 2,270 houses had been built in Kingswood, of which a thousand were from the early Kesteven way builds; 514 from the phase 1 planning permissions gained in 1994; and 756 houses built of the 5,295 permitted by phase 2 planning permissions obtained in 2004. In 2013 the Kingswood Academy school opened, (Note: 53.798375°N 0.326243°W, Kingswood Academy) built on the site of the former Perronet Thompson School, established in 1988 for the Bransholme estate.

By end of March 2015 a total of 3,576 houses had been in the Kingswood area, with a potential 3,105 plots remaining. The original 1994 60 hectares (150 acres) land allocation for employment use, and the aspiration of 4,000 jobs created in the area had not been realised by 2015, with much of the assigned land undeveloped for industry.

Building development of the 'local centre' or 'village centre' started c. 2008/9 with the construction of the Kingswood Health Centre. Further building development in the village centre started in 2013/4: Kingswood Parks Primary opened in 2014; (Note: 53.800955°N 0.353349°W, Kingswood primary school) additionally planning permission for two small multi occupancy shop and flat units was given in 2013; (Note: 53.801716°N 0.352120°W, Kingswood 'Village Centre' (shopping)) construction began in early 2014 for completion late in the same year – the occupant of the largest unit was to be a Co-op store.

In late 2015 groundwork began on a large Next plc store opposite the existing retail park. Hull City Council's plans for further expansion of shopping facilities at Kingswood were shelved in 2016, following concerns raised by a government inspector on any further development's impact on the wider commercial economy in the Hull area.

In mid 2016 planning permission was given for a 750 home 'phase 1' development of total area 92 acres (37 ha) expanding housing development west of north Bransholme and Wawne Road; east of the existing Kingswood Parks and Engine Drain; and north of the early (1980s) development north of Kesteven Way. The whole development, named "Wawne View", was expected to consist of over 1,600 homes, with a ten-year construction schedule.

== See also ==
- List of areas in Kingston upon Hull
