= Dave Hartnett =

British former civil servant

- Born: David Anthony Hartnett; 25 February 1951 (age 75)
- Education: Birmingham University
- Occupations: Consultant, deloitte
- Known for: Former CEO, HM Revenue and Customs
- Spouse: Aileen Patricia Mary O'Dempsey
- Children: 3

David Anthony Hartnett CB (born 25 February 1951) is a former British civil servant who served as the Permanent Secretary for Tax at HM Revenue and Customs (HMRC) until his retirement in July 2012. Following his retirement he advised HSBC on financial crime governance alongside former Director General of the Serious Organised Crime Agency, Bill Hughes.

== Early life ==
Hartnett studied Classics at the University of Birmingham, graduating in 1973.

== Career ==
Hartnett joined the then Inland Revenue in 1976. As a graduate tax inspector, he spent his first 10 years in Birmingham. He advanced to the position of Director of Capital and Savings in 1998. Following the merger of the Inland Revenue and HM Customs & Excise in 2004, he became HMRC's Director General for Customer Contact and Compliance Strategy and then Director General for Business.

He was one of Her Majesty's Commissioners of Revenue and Customs, the formal governing board of HMRC, from the board's creation in 2005 until his retirement, having previously been a board member of the Inland Revenue. On the Board, he acted as Director General of Policy and Technical.

When Paul Gray resigned as chairman following the loss of the Child Benefit database, Hartnett took over the post in an acting capacity. After permanent replacements were appointed, Mike Clasper as non-executive chairman and Lesley Strathie as Chief Executive, Hartnett was appointed to a new post of Second Permanent Secretary for Tax, with responsibility for tax professionalism.

In May 2013, Hartnett became a consultant to the tax firm Deloitte.

From 2014 to 2023, Hartnett was a member of the board of governors at St Mary's University. For three months in 2020 he was the University's interim Vice-Chancellor.

=== Incorrect income tax collection ===
In September 2010, Hartnett was widely criticised for refusing to apologise for the HMRC issue which involved millions of people being required to pay due but uncollected tax. It was claimed that HMRC had failed to collect PAYE correctly. He told BBC Radio 4 "I'm not sure I need to apologise ...We didn't get it wrong." He later issued an unreserved apology, though no PAYE error had been identified.

=== Corporate tax avoidance ===
For a period after October 2010, protesters blockaded and protested outside Vodafone stores across the UK following allegations of tax evasion of up to £6 billion, illustrated in a series of articles in Private Eye. These articles alleged preferential treatment of Vodafone due to personal connections between Hartnett and John Connors, Vodafone's head of tax, a former colleague at HMRC.

In May 2011 Private Eye alleged Hartnett personally "shook hands" on a deal over a long-running tax avoidance dispute with Goldman Sachs dating back to 2002, without consulting HMRC lawyers, letting the US bank off around £10m in interest. Complaints from HMRC informants that Hartnett personally intervened in settlement cases and agreed to "sweetheart deals" with no explanation or consultation with lawyers have also been published. In October 2011, The Guardian published leaked papers regarding the deal.

Hartnett was presented by activists from UK Uncut with a spoof "Golden Handshake award" at a dinner in New College, Oxford honouring his retirement in September 2012. Several activists had donned evening dress and name badges to indicate that they were from Vodafone and Goldman Sachs, and effused over Hartnett's help in saving those companies billions of pounds in taxes. Robert Venables QC, who was at the dinner, first told the intruders to "depart immediately, before we set the dogs on you", before finally ejecting them with the final words "You are trespassing scum. Go".

While HMRC boss, Hartnett negotiated a tax deal that granted HSBC's bankers virtually guaranteed immunity from prosecution for any crimes they might have committed relating to tax fraud in Switzerland. Later in January 2013, he moved on to work at HSBC.

=== Corporate hospitality ===
Hartnett was named by City University London in July 2010 as the most "wined and dined" civil servant in Britain, having been treated to corporate hospitality 107 times over a period of three years.

He stated that his approach to tax disputes with large corporations was "handling disputes in a non-confrontational way and collaborating with customers wherever possible". Harnett claims that this approach secured larger settlements of tax collected faster and more cheaply than if HMRC had taken the taxpayers to court, but this is disputed by Private Eye, who cite particular deals made by Harnett including the arrangement with Vodafone that lost the exchequer approximately £6 billion.

== Honours ==
Hartnett was appointed Companion of the Order of the Bath (CB) in the 2003 New Year Honours.

== Personal life ==
In 1977, Hartnett married Aileen Patricia Mary O'Dempsey; the couple have three children. She works as a divorce lawyer, and they live in St Albans, Hertfordshire.

== Offices held ==
Government offices
Preceded by Paul Gray	Chairman of HM Revenue & Customs; Acting; 2007–2008	Succeeded by Mike Clasper as Non-executive chairman, HMRC
Preceded by Paul Gray	Chairman of HM Revenue & Customs; Acting; 2007–2008	Succeeded by Lesley Strathie as Chief Executive, HMRC
New office	Second Permanent Secretary for Tax; HM Revenue & Customs; 2008–2012	Succeeded by Edward Troup
