= List of UK government data losses =

The following is a list of UK government data losses. It lists reported instances of the loss of personal data by UK central and local government, agencies, non-departmental public bodies, etc., whether directly or indirectly because of the actions of private-sector contractors. Such losses tend to receive widespread media coverage in the UK.

Date		Department	Number of records lost	Description	References
2026	September	Ministry of Justice		Confidential court records related to victims of the 2024 Southport stabbings were accessed by unauthorised individuals.	
2026		Department for Education	607,000	Telephone numbers and email addresses of individuals and organisations due to hacks on two departmental systems.	
2026	August	Metropolitan Police	140	Complainants in the investigation into Mohamed Al-Fayed were disclosed to one another due to an email list being sent out using Cc rather than Bcc.	
2026	August	UK Government Investments	51	Names and contact details of government officials were publicly available for 40 hours.	
2026	March	Companies House		Users of the 'WebFiling' system could access and change details about other limited companies, as well as file accounts and other company documents.	
2025	October	Foreign Office		Systems operated by the Foreign Office on behalf of the Home Office were breached. (Press reports claim Chinese hackers were responsible.)	
2025		Legal Aid Agency		Breach of personal data concerning applicants for legal aid (both civil and criminal) and their legal representatives.	
2025		Ministry of Defence	3,700	Details of Afghans being resettled in the UK were lost following a data breach by a subcontracter.	
2024		Ministry of Defence		Names and bank details of serving military personnel lost following hack to payroll system.	
2024		Leicester City Council	1.3 TB	Ransomware attack led to the publication of large quantities of personally identifiable information including rent statements, applications to purchase council housing under Right to Buy, and accompanying identity documents.	
2023		Police Service of Northern Ireland		Details of all police employees accidentally published on WhatDoTheyKnow in response to a request under the Freedom of Information Act 2000. (See: PSNI data breaches)	
2023		Metropolitan Police	47,000	Contractor who supplies ID cards to the Metropolitan Police was subject of a ransomware attack. Ransomware attackers had access to information about 47,000 police staff (including police officers) and contractors, including name, photo, rank and vetting status.	
2023	August	Norfolk Constabulary and Suffolk Constabulary	1,230	Police in Norfolk and Suffolk accidentally published personal details of sexual abuse victims, witnesses and suspects on their website in response to a request under the Freedom of Information Act 2000.	
2023	July	Ministry of Defence		A number of emails were sent to .ml domains (rather than ".mil") due to human error.	
2022		Ministry of Defence	19,000	Spreadsheet containing details of Afghans fleeing the Taliban accidentally leaked by UK Special Forces headquarters official. A High Court injunction was sought to forbid publication of the data until 2025.	
2022		Electoral Commission		Names and addresses of all registered voters in the United Kingdom (except anonymous registrations).	
2021		Department for Work and Pensions		Court bundles for Child Maintenance appeals were sent out with personal information unredacted, including the address of a person whose ex-partner had a history of domestic violence.	
2020		Public Health Wales	18,105	Initials, date of birth, geographical area and sex of those who tested positive for COVID-19 were published online due to human error.	
2020		Department for Work and Pensions	6,000	National Insurance numbers of 6,000 disabled benefits claimants were publicly accessible for two years.	
2020		NHS Scotland, Lanarkshire	500	Clinical information concerning 500 patients was shared through unauthorised WhatsApp groups. A third party was added to said groups and discovered the material.	
2019		Cabinet Office	1,000+	CSV file of New Year Honours recipients was published online, with personal address details for some recipients.	
2017		Independent Inquiry into Child Sexual Abuse	90	Emails were sent via CC rather than BCC, revealing 90 names of victims of child sexual abuse.	
2017		Heathrow Airport	2.5GB / 76 folders	Lost unencrypted USB storage device containing complete security information for Heathrow airport including badges, maps, CCTV camera locations, etc.	
2015		Ministry of Defence		British Army footage and photographs of Operation Motorman were found to be missing.	
2014		Foreign Office		Records of Diego Garcia flights and the UK's role in the CIA rendition programme were destroyed by water damage.	
2014		Home Office	114	Files linked to 1980s Westminster paedophile ring allegations were found to be missing. (See also: Westminster paedophile dossier.)	
2013		Serious Fraud Office		Documents related to the investigation of BAE Systems were lost accidentally. The data amounted to 32,000 physical pages of text, 81 tapes of audio, and other electronic media.	
2013	November	Suffolk County Council		An unencrypted USB memory stick was found containing information from the county’s adult and community services department. It had internal memos and copies of e-mails about forthcoming projects – and it also had tables containing the names of clients.	
2013	July	NHS Greater Glasgow and Clyde	60	A folder containing patient records was found in a car park and handed in by a member of the public.	
2012		Greater Manchester Police	over 1,000	An unencrypted USB stick containing details of witnesses with links to serious criminal investigations that was being kept in a police officer's house was stolen in a burglary. The force was fined £120,000.	
2012		South London NHS Trust	600	Records on 600 maternity patients and their newborn children were lost by misplacing unencrypted USB sticks.	
2012	May	NHS Surrey	3,000	Computer used by the NHS was sold on auction website eBay without being properly cleansed of patient records.	
2012	February	Office for Nuclear Regulation (ONR)		A memory stick containing a safety assessment of a nuclear power plant in north-east England has been lost by an official. The unencrypted USB pen drive, containing a 'stress test' safety assessment of the Hartlepool plant.	
2011	February	Powys County Council		A file containing details of a child protection case was leaked accidentally. The council was fined £130,000.	
2010	September	Brighton General Hospital		Hard drives containing patient data were stolen.	
2008	November	Department for Work and Pensions	n/a	USB memory stick, apparently encrypted and containing passwords for an old version of the Government Gateway, a website giving access to millions of records of personal data.	
2008	October	Ministry of Defence	1,700,000	Hard drive being held by contractor EDS is found to be missing.	
2008	September	Service Personnel and Veterans Agency	50,500	Three USB portable hard drives with details of staff are allegedly stolen from a high security facility at RAF Innsworth. The Agency holds records on 900,000 current and former personnel. Stolen records included sensitive information about the private lives of senior staff.	
2008	September	National Offender Management Service	5,000	A hard drive containing details of 5,000 employees of the National Offender Management Service was lost by EDS.	
2008	September	Insolvency Service	400	Names, addresses and bank details of up to 400 directors of 122 firms were lost when four laptops were stolen from a Manchester premises.	
2008	September	Tees, Esk and Wear Valleys NHS Trust	200	Memory stick with details of patients found in a public park.	
2008	August	Home Office	84,000	PA Consulting lost an unencrypted memory stick containing details of high risk, prolific and other offenders.	
2008	August	Colchester Hospital University NHS Foundation Trust	21,000	A manager's unencrypted laptop holding patient addresses and treatment details is stolen from his car whilst on holiday in Edinburgh	
2008	January	Royal Navy	600,000	A Royal Navy officer's laptop was stolen that contained the details of 600,000 applicants and others who had expressed interest in joining the Armed Forces including both the Navy, Marines and Air Force.	
2007	December	Department for Work and Pensions	45,000	West Yorkshire benefit claimants' in data lost.	
2007	December	Department for Work and Pensions	000s	CDs with personal data found at the home of a former contractor.	
2007	November	City and Hackney Teaching Primary Care Trust	160,000	"Heavily encrypted" disks containing details of children are lost by couriers. The loss prompted the agency to implement hard drive and USB memory stick encryption systems across all PCs.	
2007	November	Foreign and Commonwealth Office	50,000	Details of visa applicants were made available on an FCO website.	
2007	November	HM Revenue and Customs	25,000,000	Two CDs containing details of the families of child benefits claimants went missing in the post. HMRC's handling of data was described as "woefully inadequate" and staff were described as "muddling through" in a June 2008 Independent Police Complaints Commission report.	
2007	July	Ministry of Justice	5,000	Hard disk with details of HM Prison Service staff is lost on the premises of EDS.	
2007	May	Driving Standards Agency	3,000,000	Hard disk with details of candidates for the driving theory test was lost in a premises in Iowa by subcontractors.	
2007	May	Foreign and Commonwealth Office	50	Details of individuals made public after "unauthorised disclosure by a contractor"	
1961		Foreign Office		Many of the most sensitive documents from the UK's colonial era were destroyed under the direction of Secretary of State for the Colonies Iain Macleod.	
