= Jim Harra =

British civil servant (born 1962)

Sir Jim Harra KCB
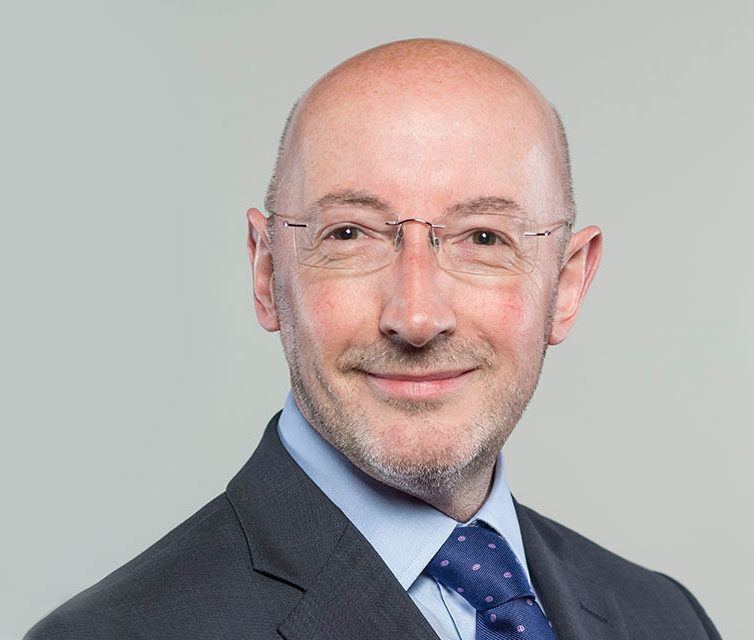
- Harra in 2017

Chief Executive of NS&I
- Incumbent
- Assumed office March 2026
- Preceded by: Dax Harkins

Chief Executive of HM Revenue & Customs
- In office October 2019 – April 2025
- Minister: Sajid Javid; Rishi Sunak; Nadhim Zahawi; Kwasi Kwarteng; Jeremy Hunt; Rachel Reeves
- Deputy: Angela MacDonald
- Preceded by: Jon Thompson
- Succeeded by: John-Paul Marks

Sir James Alan Harra, KCB (born July 1962) is a British civil servant who served as First Permanent Secretary and Chief Executive of HM Revenue and Customs from October 2019 to April 2025. In March 2026, Harra was announced as the new head of National Savings and Investments by the pensions minister, Torsten Bell.

== Background ==
Harra's family are based at Dollingstown in County Down, Northern Ireland. He was educated at Donaghcloney Primary School, Tandragee Junior High School and then Portadown College. He read law at Queen's University, Belfast and then became an inspector of taxes with the Inland Revenue in 1984.

== Career ==
In January 2009, Harra became Director of Corporation Tax and VAT, and then Director of Personal Tax Customer Operations in March 2011, and Director Personal Tax Operations in October 2011. He was Director-General for Business Tax from 2012 to 2016, when he succeeded Edward Troup as Tax Assurance Commissioner. He became Tax Assurance Commissioner and Director General Customer Strategy and Design in October 2016 and was appointed Second Permanent Secretary at HMRC in November 2017. He is also a member of the Board of the department.

In November 2017, Harra appeared on BBC's Panorama programme about VAT fraud.

Harra was also HMRC's LGB&T Champion.

In October 2024 it was announced that Harra would retire from HMRC in April 2025. He was replaced by John-Paul Marks.

== Honours ==
Harra was appointed a Companion of the Order of the Bath (CB) in the 2015 New Year Honours and a Knight Commander (KCB) of the same order in the 2024 Birthday Honours.

== Offices held ==
Government offices
Preceded by Sir Jon Thompson	Chief Executive of HM Revenue and Customs; 2019–2024	Succeeded by John-Paul Marks
