= Bill Hughes (police officer) =

British police officer (born 1950)

William Frederick Hughes CBE QPM (born 11 August 1950) was Director General of Britain's Serious Organised Crime Agency until his retirement on 31 August 2010, when he was succeeded by his deputy Trevor Pearce. He was formerly Director General of the National Crime Squad, until its merger with SOCA on 1 April 2006. Hughes was, until October 2012, International Director at BlueLight Global Solutions. He then took up a role advising HSBC on financial crime governance alongside former Permanent Secretary for Tax at HMRC, Dave Hartnett.

Hughes was educated at Aston University, where he received his degree in mechanical engineering in 1973. He began his career in the police force with the Thames Valley Police in 1975, rising to become Assistant Chief Constable in the West Yorkshire Police, then Deputy Chief Constable with the Hertfordshire Constabulary. He joined the National Crime Squad in 2000.

He was the UK Head of Delegation at European Police Chiefs Task Force and Chairman of the G8 Lyon Group on law enforcement.

Hughes was appointed Commander of the Order of the British Empire (CBE) in the 2009 Birthday Honours.
