= Strathie =

Strathie is a surname. Notable people with the surname include:

- Angus Strathie, Australian costume designer
- Lesley Strathie (née Cooke; 1955–2012), British senior civil servant
