= Gershon Review =

Review of UK Public sector

The Gershon Efficiency Review was an independent review of efficiency in the UK public sector conducted in 2003-4 by Sir Peter Gershon. (Note: An earlier Review of Civil Procurement in Central Government was completed by Gershon in April 1999, commissioned by the Paymaster General (then Geoffrey Robinson) and the Parliamentary Secretary to the Cabinet Office. This review recommended the establishment of a central procurement organisation within central government, which Gershon called the 'Office of Government Commerce' and which was created under that name in 2000.)

Gordon Brown and Tony Blair, then Chancellor of the Exchequer and Prime Minister respectively, appointed Peter Gershon, at that time the head of the Office of Government Commerce, to review operations across all public services and make recommendations regarding expenditure and efficiency. His report recommended making savings for Financial Year 2005–6, to be achieved through dramatic changes to the organisation of each government department and automating their work patterns, in order to 'release' resources from the public sector budget that was then approximately £520bn. These gross savings of £21.5bn were reported to have been achieved by 2007 and agreed as part of the Comprehensive Spending Review in 2004 and subsequent budget.

The effect of these objectives has been for all government departments to agree reductions on their long-term budgets, and then work out how to fulfill these challenging promises without crippling their existing obligations and service.

== Benefits ==
Certain functions were identified as offering good opportunities for savings through the use of ICT, such as tax collection and benefits payments. Aggregating and reorganising other functions offers the promise of savings in procurement, buildings and facilities. The approach encourages departments to meet the government's desire for 'Joined-up Government' that smooths out the delivery of services, and supports initiatives such as the use of a Common Systems Strategy as suggested in Sir David Varney's Report and the Transformational Government strategy.

== Problems ==
However, not all government functions present such clear opportunities; those with a large proportion of physical assets or customer-facing staff have great challenges to offer the equivalent level of savings without suffering damage to their level of service.

The timeframe also gives these organisations the challenge of investing in new services at a time when departmental headcount and budgets are being cut. In reality, the 'Gershon reviews' have been applied in waves across organisations.

In many instances the Treasury has interpreted this release of resources to be a cost saving for reallocation outside to other projects or departments.

Relocations recommended by Gershon have resulted in considerable loss of expertise, for example at the UK's Office For National Statistics, which has been criticized by the Chair of the Treasury Select committee.

== Team members ==
The team that supported Sir Peter Gershon in this work was drawn from a number of Government departments and consultancy organisations:

- Simon King, HEDRA
- Anna Longman, HM Treasury
- Gillian Magee, PA Consulting Group
- Sue Moon, Kent and Medway NHS Strategic Health Authority
- Graham Murray, IBM
- John Pendlebury-Green, PA Consulting Group
- Sheila Pringle, Deloitte and Touche
- Neil Reeder, HM Treasury
- Bill Roots, Solace Enterprises
- Nathalie Ross, Nathalie Ross Consulting
- Tony Smith, IBM
- Mike Binnington Deloitte and Touche
- James Bromiley National Audit Office
- Alan Collier OGC
- Paul Connolly HEDRA
- Rob Devlen Hewlett-Packard
- Zoe Elliot Cabinet Office
- Nicholas Fox IBM
- Gerry Friell HM Treasury
- Paul Kirby Cabinet Office
- Liz Lawrence Cabinet Office
- John Hood PA Consulting
- Rebecca Khodr Cabinet Office
- Judi Stockwell, PA Consulting Group
- Jenny Swan, Ofgem
- Emily Teller, Cabinet Office
- Graham Turnock, HM Treasury
- Bob Walding, Audit Commission
- Graham Walker, Office of the e-Envoy
- Martin Walker, Hewlett-Packard
- Andrew Ward, PA Consulting Group
- Alice Webb, PA Consulting Group
- David Williams, Insource Solutions
- Marian Wilson, Inland Revenue
- Nadia Zahawi, HEDRA
