= United Kingdom child benefit data breach =

Data security scandal in the UK

In October 2007, two computer discs owned by HM Revenue and Customs containing the data of all child benefit recipients (about 7.25 million families in the United Kingdom) were lost. The incident was publicly disclosed by the Chancellor of the Exchequer, Alistair Darling, on 20 November 2007.

== The loss ==
The discs were sent by junior staff at HM Revenue and Customs (HMRC) based at Waterview Park in Washington, Tyne and Wear, to the National Audit Office (NAO), as unrecorded internal mail via TNT on 18 October. On 24 October the NAO complained to HMRC that they had not received the data. On 8 November, senior officials in HMRC were informed of the loss, with Chancellor of the Exchequer, Alistair Darling being informed on 10 November. On 20 November Darling announced:

Two password-protected discs containing a full copy of HMRC's entire data in relation to the payment of child benefit was sent to the NAO by HMRC's internal post system operated by the courier TNT. The package was not recorded or registered. It appears the data has failed to reach the address in the NAO.

The lost data was thought to concern approximately 25 million people in the UK (nearly half of the country's population). The personal data on the missing discs was reported to include names and addresses of parents and children and dates of birth of the children, together with the National Insurance numbers and bank or building society details of their parents.

The "password protection" in question is that provided by WinZip version 8. This is a weak, proprietary scheme (unnamed encryption and hash algorithms) with well-known attacks. Anyone competent in computing would be able to break this protection by downloading readily-available tools. WinZip version 9 introduced AES encryption, which would have been secure and only breakable by a brute-force attack.

In a list of frequently asked questions, on the BBC News website a breakdown of the loss was reported as being:

- 7.25 million claimants
- 15.5 million children, including some who no longer qualify but whose family is claiming for a younger child
- 2.25 million 'alternative payees' such as partners or carers
- 3,000 'appointees' who claim the benefit under court instructions
- 12,500 agents who claim the benefit on behalf of a third party

Whilst government ministers claimed that a junior official was to blame, the Conservatives said that the fault lay in part with senior management. This was based on a claim that the National Audit Office had requested that bank details be removed from the data before it was sent, but that HMRC had denied this request, because it would be "too costly and complicated". Emails released on 22 November confirmed that senior HMRC officials had been made aware of the decision on cost grounds not to strip out sensitive information. The cost of removing sensitive information has been given as £5,000. Although the cost was found to be substantially less (£650) in an academic study.

According to an IT trade journal Computer Weekly, it said that back in March 2007, the NAO had asked for completed information of the child benefit database to be sent by post on CDs, instead of a sample of the database. The first time this was done, things went smoothly, and the package was registered post. However this time, it was unregistered through the courier.

It was later revealed, on 17 December 2007, that the data protection manual for HMRC was in itself under restriction to only senior members of staff, not junior civil servants who had just a summary of what the manual says on security.

=== Other data scandals ===
This was followed by several other data scandals. On 17 December it was revealed by Ruth Kelly that the details of three million learner drivers were lost in the United States in May of 2007. However the only details said to be lost were the: name, address, phone number, the fee paid, the test centre, payment code and e-mail, so not much of a panic was caused due to a reduced risk of financial fraud. On 23 December it was revealed that nine National Health Service (NHS) trusts had also lost the data of hundreds of thousands of patients, some of it archive information, some of it medical records, contact details and soft financial data. A few other trusts also lost data, but found it fairly quickly. Several other UK firms have also admitted security failings.

== Response ==
Darling stated that there was no indication that the details had fallen into criminal hands, but he urged those affected to monitor their bank accounts. He said "If someone is the innocent victim of fraud as a result of this incident, people can be assured they have protection under the Banking Code so they will not suffer any financial loss as a result." HMRC then set up a Child Benefit Helpline for those concerned about the data loss.

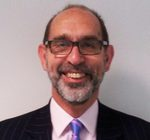
HMRC chairman Paul Gray resigned

The incident was a breach of the UK's Data Protection Act and resulted in the resignation of HMRC chairman Paul Gray; Darling commented that the discs were probably destroyed when "the hunt was on, probably within days" and that there was an "opaque" management structure at HMRC and it was difficult to see who was responsible for what. Gray was subsequently found to be working at Cabinet Office. The Metropolitan Police and the Independent Police Complaints Commission both investigated the security breach, and uniformed police officers investigated HMRC offices. The loss led to much criticism by the Acting Leader of the Liberal Democrats Vince Cable and Shadow Chancellor George Osborne. Osborne said:

Let us be clear about the scale of this catastrophic mistake— the names, the addresses and the dates of birth of every child in the country are sitting on two computer discs that are apparently lost in the post, and the bank account details and National Insurance numbers of ten million parents, guardians and carers have gone missing.

In addition he said that it was the "final blow for the ambitions of this government to create a national ID database". Cable also criticised the use of disks in the modern age of electronic data transfer. Spokespersons for Gordon Brown, however, said that the Prime Minister fully supported Darling, and said that Darling had not expressed any intention to resign.

The general reaction of the public was one of anger and worry. Banks, individuals, businesses and government departments became more vigilant over data fraud and identity theft and the government pledged to be more careful with data. The public and media was particularly angry over the fact that the data was not registered or recorded, and that it was not securely encrypted.

Nick Assinder, a political correspondent at the BBC, expressed the opinion that he believed Darling to be "on borrowed time". George Osborne, who questioned whether Darling was "up to the job", suggested that it would be a matter of days before a decision was made regarding Darling's future. However Darling remained Chancellor until Labour's defeat in 2010.

TNT stated that, as the delivery was not recorded, it would not be possible to even ascertain if it had actually been sent, let alone where it went.

=== Jeremy Clarkson direct debit fraud ===
On 7 January 2008, Jeremy Clarkson found himself the subject of direct debit fraud after publishing his bank account and sort code details in his column in The Sun to make the point that public concern over the scandal was unnecessary. He wrote, “All you'll be able to do with them is put money into my account. Not take it out. Honestly, I've never known such a palaver about nothing”. Someone then used these details to set up a £500 direct debit to the charity Diabetes UK. In his next Sunday Times column, Clarkson wrote, “I was wrong and I have been punished for my mistake.″ Under the terms of the Direct Debit Guarantee, the payment could be reversed.

== See also ==
- List of UK government data losses
- United Kingdom government security breaches
