= Newland School for Girls =

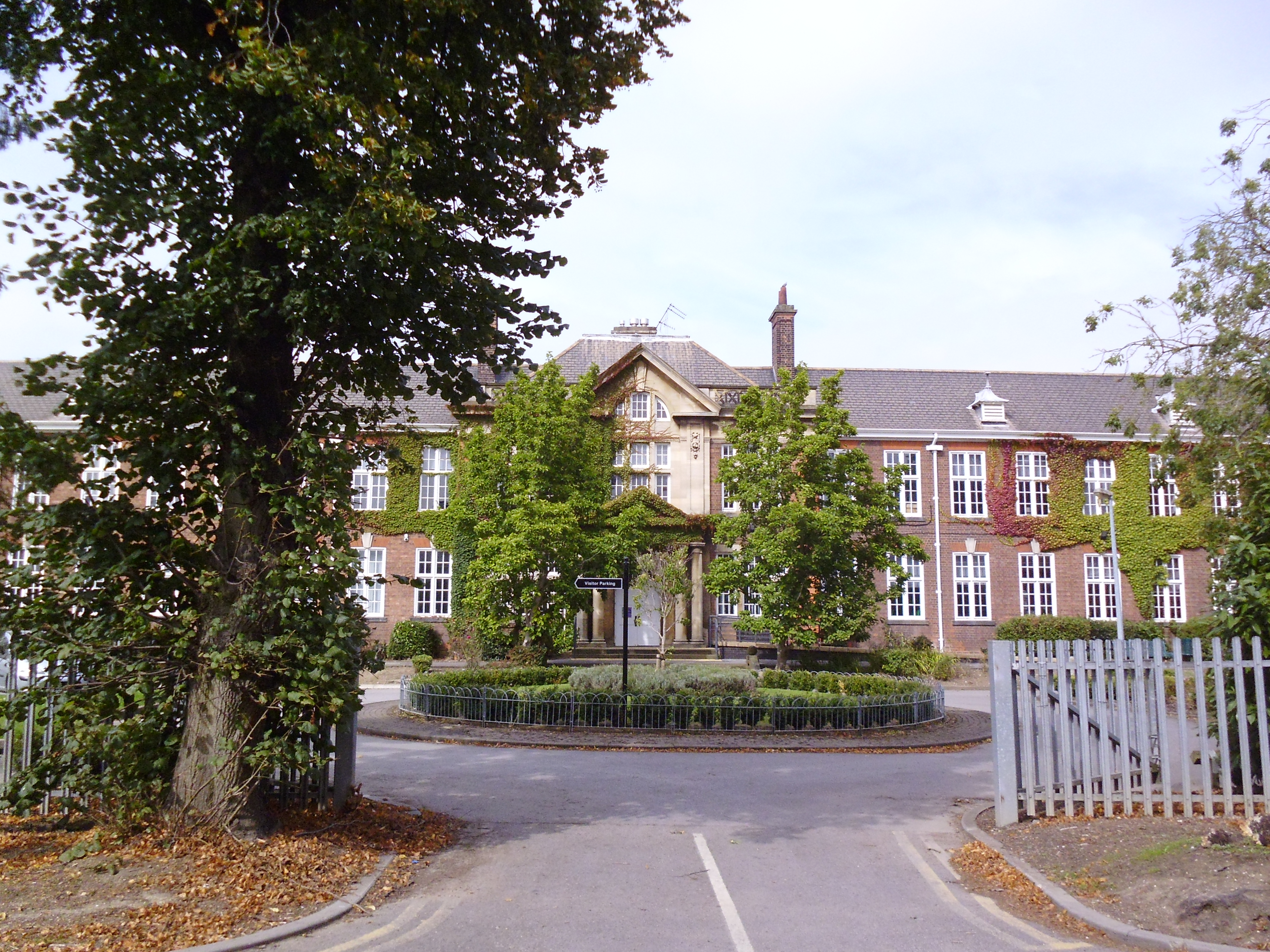

Location
- Cottingham Road; Newland; Kingston upon Hull, East Riding of Yorkshire, HU6 7RU; England; 53.7719°N 0.3711°W

Information
- Type: Academy
- Motto: "Ad Lucem"
- Established: 1907
- Local authority: Hull City Council
- Trust: Yorkshire and the Humber Co-operative Learning Trust
- Department for Education URN: 144307 Tables
- Ofsted: Reports
- Head teacher: Vicky Callaghan
- Gender: Female
- Age: 11 to 16
- Enrolment: 849 (January 2008)
- Houses: Phoenix, Griffin, Unicorn, Triton
- Colours: Green, Purple and White
- Website: http://www.newlandschool.co.uk/

Newland School For Girls is a secondary school for girls aged 11– 16, situated in the Newland area of Kingston upon Hull, England.

== History ==
Newland School was founded in 1907 to meet the growing demand for girls' education. It opened on the site of the former Central Secondary School in Brunswick Avenue.

A new building was constructed for the school on Cottingham Road but was initially used as a First World War military hospital. In 1920 the school moved to its new site in Cottingham Road and was renamed Newland High School. There were 480 girls on the roll in 1911, 598 in 1936 and 680 in 1963.

In 2005 Hull City Council proposed closing and consolidating Newland School with Hull Trinity House School, but after outcries from both schools the plan was shelved and modernisation of the facilities was begun.

On 28 August 2007 the school celebrated its centenary. The school's unofficial song is 'The City of the Light', an old hymn which has been interpreted as an advanced metaphor for the unity needed to bring together a successful school. The school's motto 'Ad Lucem' ('to the light') is in keeping with this theme.

In 2009 Newland School was listed as part of a £400 million plan to modernise all Hull schools; Newland was said to require "extensive rebuilding work". While the building work was undertaken the school relocated to the Sir Henry Cooper School site on Thorpepark Road, Orchard Park Estate. The school relocated to its original site in September 2013.

Previously a community school administered by Hull City Council, in June 2017 Newland School for Girls converted to academy status. The school is now sponsored by the Yorkshire and the Humber Co-operative Learning Trust.

== Notable former pupils ==
=== Newland High School For Girls ===
- Jill Bonner, physicist and 440 yards sprinter
- Nia Griffith, Labour MP since 2005 for Llanelli, and Shadow Secretary of State for Defence since October 2016
- Maureen Lipman CBE, actress, known for 1990s BT adverts
- Elaine Padmore OBE (initially, then moved to Blackpool), director of opera from 2000 to 2011 at the Royal Opera House
- Betty Radice, former Joint Editor of Penguin Classics
- Commandant Anne Spencer CBE, the last director from 1991 to 1993 of the Women's Royal Naval Service (WRNS), and director from 1986 to 1989 of NAAFI
- Dame Valerie Strachan CB, senior civil servant, chairman from 1993 to 2000 of HM Customs and Excise, and president from 2002 to 2004 of the British International Freight Association
