= David Varney =

British public servant (1946–2024)

Sir David Varney
- Born: David Robert Varney; 11 May 1946
- Died: 2 October 2024 (aged 78)
- Education: Brockley County Grammar School
- Alma mater: University of Surrey
- Occupation: Chairman of HM Revenue and Customs

Sir David Robert Varney (11 May 1946 – 2 October 2024) was a British public servant who was the chairman of HM Revenue and Customs from its establishment in April 2005 to the end of August 2006. He was knighted in the 2006 New Year's honours list. In the same year he was awarded an Honorary Degree, Doctor of Laws (LL. D.) from the University of Bath.

== Early life and private sector career ==
Varney was born on 11 May 1946. After graduating in Chemistry from the University of Surrey, where he was President of the Students' Union, Varney joined Shell in 1968. In 1990 he was appointed Head of Marketing, Branding and Product Development for Shell International Petroleum and in 1991 was appointed a managing director of Shell UK with responsibility for downstream activities. He was appointed a Director of Shell International Petroleum in 1996.

In June 1996 Varney joined BG (formerly British Gas), as Chief Executive designate of the proposed BG plc and was appointed Chief Executive the following year, overseeing the successful demerger of Lattice plc. He was chairman of mobile phone operator mmO_{2} between 2001 and 2004. He was also Chairman of Business in the Community and president of the Chartered Management Institute.

== HM Revenue and Customs ==
HM Revenue and Customs was formed from the merger of the Inland Revenue and HM Customs & Excise in April 2005. Varney was appointed the first executive chairman of the merged organisation having carried out that role in a shadow capacity from October 2004.

Varney's previous career as a private sector executive differs from the traditional career path of senior Civil Service heads. On taking the role, Varney faced a number of key challenges including maintaining business-as-usual while delivering around 12,000 staff cuts under the Gershon Review and moving jobs out of the South-East of England under the Lyons Review.

Following the ending of his chairmanship of HM Revenue and Customs, he took up a role at HM Treasury as a permanent secretary. In December 2006, he delivered the report "Service Transformation: a better service for citizens and businesses, a better deal for the taxpayer", which aimed to improve the UK's service performance in interacting with citizens and businesses.

== Death ==
Varney died from a pulmonary embolism on 2 October 2024, at the age of 78.

Government offices
| Preceded by Sir Nick Montagu | Chairman of the Inland Revenue; 2004–2005 | Succeeded by Himself; As Chairman of Her Majesty's Revenue and Customs |
| Preceded by Sir Richard Broadbent | Chairman of Her Majesty's Customs and Excise; 2004–2005 | Succeeded by Himself; As Chairman of Her Majesty's Revenue and Customs |
| Preceded by Himself; As Chairman of the Inland Revenue and Chairman of Her Majesty's Customs and Excise | Chairman of Her Majesty's Revenue and Customs; 2005–2006 | Succeeded by Paul Gray |
