= Mark Thurston =

British businessman (born 1967)

Mark Thurston (born 1966 or 1967) is a British electrical engineer and businessman. He was chief executive of the High Speed 2 railway construction project from March 2017 to September 2023. He is currently chief executive at Anglian Water.

== Early life ==
Thurston and attended The Wallington High School for Boys in his senior school years. He attended Loughborough University from 1999 to 2001, gaining an MSc in Engineering Management. In 2021, the University awarded him an honorary degree of Doctor of Technology.

== Career ==
Thurston began his career as an apprentice with Transport for London. He later worked for Metronet. In June 2008, he joined CH2M as head of structures, bridges and highways, working on both Crossrail and London 2012.

On 26 January 2017, Thurston was appointed chief executive of High Speed 2. In 2022–2023, he was the highest paid of all UK public sector employees. Thurston went on to become the longest serving chief executive for High Speed 2, and stayed on until 2023 when he announced his resignation and then left the project in September of that year.

Thurston was appointed as visiting professor of Complex Project and Programme Leadership at his alma mater, Loughborough University, in 2021.

== See also ==
- Sir David Higgins, Chairman of HS2
- High-speed rail in the United Kingdom

Business positions
Preceded by Simon Kirby	Chief Executive of High Speed 2 March 2017 - September 2023	Succeeded by Jon Thompson (Interim Executive Chairman)
