= Brian Unwin =

British civil servant and author

- Born: 21 September 1935 (age 90)
- Education: New College, Oxford, Yale
- Occupations: Civil servant, author

Sir James Brian Unwin KCB (born 21 September 1935) is a former British civil servant and an author. He was chairman of the board of HM Customs and Excise and president of the European Investment Bank. He is also an author of historical non-fiction.

== Education and career ==
James Brian Unwin studied at New College, Oxford and Yale University.

He joined the British Civil Service in 1960, initially working for the Commonwealth Relations Office. From 1968 he was at HM Treasury, seconded from 1981 to 1987 to the Cabinet Office. There he eventually held the post of Deputy Secretary. He was chairman of the board of HM Customs and Excise (1987–1993) and became president of the European Investment Bank in 1993, a position which he held until his retirement in 1999.

He has served as president of the European Centre for Nature Conservation and as a member of the board of directors of English National Opera.

== Authorship ==
Unwin has published two works of historical non-fiction, both dealing with the Napoleonic era: Terrible Exile: The Last Days of Napoleon on St Helena (2010), which was shortlisted for the Fondation Napoléon History Prize, and A Tale in Two Cities: Fanny Burney and Adèle, Comtesse de Boigne (2014). In 2016, Unwin published a memoir of his time in the civil service titled 'With respect, minister'.

== Honours ==
On 13 June 1986, Unwin was appointed Commander of the Order of the Bath (CB). On 5 June 1990, he was promoted to Knight Commander of the same Order (KCB) with the 1990 Birthday Honours.

Government offices
| Preceded by Sir Angus Fraser | Chairman of the Board of Customs and Excise; 1987–1993 | Succeeded by Dame Valerie Strachan |
