= Valerie Strachan =

British politician

Dame Valerie Strachan DCB

Chair of HM Customs and Excise
- In office 1993–2000
- Monarch: Elizabeth II
- Prime Minister: John Major; Tony Blair

Personal details
- Born: Valerie Patricia Marie Nicholls; 10 January 1940 (age 86)
- Citizenship: United Kingdom
- Spouse: John Strachan (m. 1965)
- Children: 2
- Education: Newland High School
- Alma mater: University of Manchester

Dame Valerie Patricia Marie Strachan, DCB (née Nicholls; born 10 January 1940) is a retired British civil servant. From 1993 to 2000, she was Chair of HM Customs and Excise. Since February 2012, she has been a member of the Judicial Appointments Commission.

== Early life and education ==
Strachan was born on 10 January 1940 to John Jonas Nicholls and Louise Nicholls.

She was educated at Newland High School, an all-girls state secondary school in Hull, Yorkshire. She then studied politics at the University of Manchester, and graduated with a Bachelor of Arts (BA) degree.

== Career ==
As a junior civil servant, worked in a number of departments: she first joined HM Customs and Excise in 1961, then moved to the Department of Economic Affairs in 1964, and then worked at the Home Office in 1966. In 1966, she returned to HM Customs and Excise as a principal officer. She was appointed an Assistant Secretary in 1974 and a Commissioner in 1980.

From 1985 to 1987, Strachan was on secondment as head of the Joint Management Unit between HM Treasury and the Cabinet Office. From 1987 to 1993, she was one of the Deputy Chairs of the Board of Excise and Customs. Then, from 1 March 1993 to 2000, she served as chair of the Board of Excise and Customs and therefore as Head of HM Customs and Excise.

Having retired from the Civil Service in 2000, Strachan has led an active retirement. From 2001 to 2002, she was a Lay Assessor on the Leggatt Inquiry, which led to the creation of the Tribunals Service. She was Vice Chair of the Big Lottery Fund between 2004 and 2006. From 2006 to 2011, she was a member of the Rosemary Nelson Inquiry. From 2006 to 2012, she was a member of the Council of the University of Southampton. From February 2012 to July 2019, she was a member of the Judicial Appointments Commission.

== Personal life ==
In 1965, Valerie Nicholls married John Strachan. Together, they have two children; one son and one daughter.

== Honours ==
In the 1991 New Year Honours, Strachan was appointed a Companion of the Order of the Bath (CB) in recognition of her service as deputy chairman of the board of HM Customs and Excise. In the 1998 Queen's Birthday Honours, she was promoted to Dame Commander of the Order of the Bath (DCB), and therefore granted the title Dame, in recognition of her service as chairman of the board of HM Customs and Excise.

In 1995, Strachan was awarded an honorary Doctor of Laws (LLD) degree by the University of Manchester, her alma mater. In July 2013, she was awarded an honorary degree by the University of Southampton.

Government offices
Preceded by Sir Brian Unwin	Chairman of the Board of Customs and Excise; 1993–2000	Succeeded by Sir Richard Broadbent
