= Peter Gershon =

British businessman and government advisor

- Born: 10 January 1947 (age 79)
- Education: University of Cambridge
- Occupation: Businessman
- Children: 3

Sir Peter Oliver Gershon, KBE, FREng (born 10 January 1947) is a British businessman and former civil servant, former chairman of Tate & Lyle, and since January 2012, Chairman of the FTSE 100 company National Grid. He is chiefly known for conducting the Gershon Review in 2004/2005 which recommended savings across the UK's public services and for being an adviser to the Conservative Party during the run up to the 2010 General Election. He has also been Chair of the Office of Government Commerce as well as sitting on the boards of several well known companies and organisations.

== Early career ==
He was educated initially at Reigate Grammar School and graduated from Cambridge University with a First in Mathematics in 1969. Gershon then joined International Computers Limited and worked in the computer industry for seventeen years, before holding senior line managerial positions in the telecommunications industry between 1987 and 1994. In 1994 he was appointed the main board director of GEC plc, where he had responsibility for the company's worldwide defence business.

In November 1998 the Paymaster General and the Parliamentary Secretary to the Cabinet Office asked him "to review civil procurement in Central Government in the light of the Government's objectives on efficiency, modernisation and competitiveness". His report on this work was published in April 1999.

== Civil service career ==
Gershon joined the Civil Service in April 2000 as the first Chief Executive of the Office of Government Commerce, where he was given a remit to implement a programme to reform the way the British government handles the annual budget of public procurement. In August 2003 he was invited to lead a major review of efficiency across the whole UK public sector by Prime Minister Tony Blair and Chancellor Gordon Brown. The Gershon Review was completed in 2004/2005 and was intended to lead to significant savings in public spending by 2007/2008.

== Return to the private sector ==
He returned to the private sector after four years of public service, and is currently Chairman of Premier Farnell plc. and Symbian Ltd. He has also led a review of Ministerial and Royal Air Travel, is a non-executive director of HM Treasury, and a member of the councils of the Royal Academy of Engineering and Imperial College London. In addition, he is an Honorary Fellow of the Institution of Electrical Engineers and the Association for Project Management; and a Fellow of the Royal Academy of Engineering, the British Computer Society, the Chartered Institute of Purchasing & Supply and the Royal Aeronautical Society. He is a Companion of the Chartered Management Institute; and a Liveryman of the Worshipful Company of Information Technologists. He holds an Honorary Doctorate in Technology from Kingston University.

== Conservative Party adviser ==
Along with another former government adviser, Dr Martin Read, Gershon became a member of the Conservatives' Public Sector Productivity Advisory Board. In the run up to the 2010 General Election, this Board claimed that savings of £12 billion in spending could be collectively saved across all Government departments without affecting the quality of front line services. The body also claimed to have identified £6bn in efficiency savings which would allow the Conservatives to avoid the Labour Party's planned rises in National Insurance contributions in 2010.

== Honours ==
Gershon was appointed a CBE for his services to industry in 2000 and knighted in 2004 for his work on public procurement. In 2001, he was elected a Fellow of the Royal Academy of Engineering (FREng).

== Personal life ==
Gershon is married with three children. His hobbies include skiing, swimming, reading, travel and the theatre. He is the second cousin once removed of Daniel Radcliffe.
