= Lesley Strathie =

British senior civil servant

Dame Lesley Ann Strathie, DCB (née Cooke; 24 September 1955 – 14 January 2012) was a British senior civil servant.

Lesley Ann Cooke was born in Stranraer, Scotland in 1955. She married David Strathie in 1974; the couple divorced in 1996). They had two children: a son (who predeceased his parents) and a daughter. Lesley Strathie was educated at Stranraer Academy and began her civil service career at age 16 at Scotland's then-Department of Health and Social Security, before moving to London in 1984.

She was named chief operating officer of Jobcentre Plus in 2003, and succeeded David Anderson as Acting Chief Executive on 16 May 2005 before being confirmed on 13 October; this appointment also made her the Second Permanent Secretary to the Department for Work and Pensions.

In November 2008 she was appointed Chief Executive and Permanent Secretary of HM Revenue and Customs (HMRC), succeeding Dave Hartnett who had worked as Acting Chief Executive and Chairman after the resignation of Paul Gray.

Under instructions from ministers, she decreased HMRC staff by thousands and closed hundreds of tax offices leading to complaints that this resulted in worse service to taxpayers. Numerous critical reports by Parliament's Public Accounts Committee were issued. On 10 June 2010, Strathie appeared on the BBC One flagship consumer programme Watchdog as a result of complaints against HMRC, mainly about the high level of mistakes.

== Illness and death ==
Strathie stood down as Chief Executive from HMRC on 9 November 2011 to concentrate on her battle against what proved to be terminal cancer. She died on 14 January 2012, aged 56.

== Honours ==
On 12 June 2010 she was appointed Dame Commander of the Order of the Bath (DCB) in the 2010 Birthday Honours.

Government offices
Preceded by Dave Hartnett (acting)	Chief Executive of Her Majesty's Revenue and Customs; 2008–2011	Succeeded by Lin Homer
