= Jon Thompson (civil servant) =

British civil servant (born 1964)

Sir Jon Thompson KCB
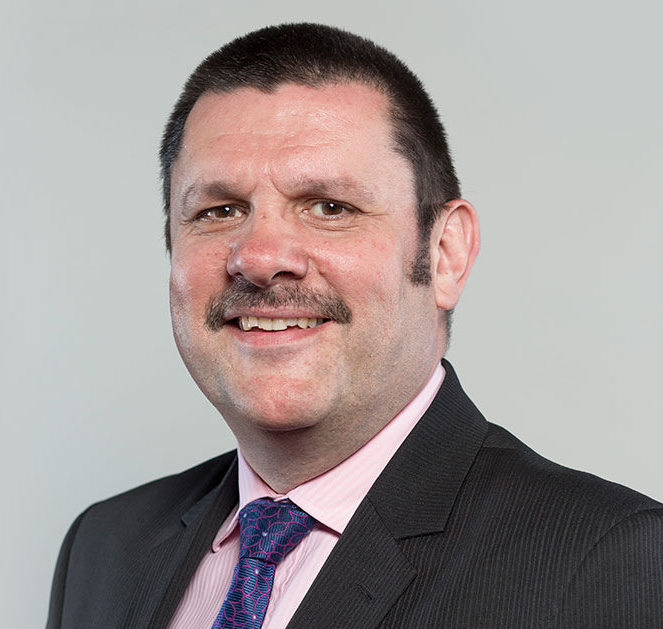
- Thompson in 2017

Permanent Secretary at HM Revenue and Customs
- In office April 2016 – October 2019
- Minister: George Osborne; Philip Hammond; Sajid Javid
- Preceded by: Dame Lin Homer
- Succeeded by: Jim Harra

Permanent Secretary at the Ministry of Defence
- In office July 2012 – April 2016
- Minister: Philip Hammond; Michael Fallon
- Preceded by: Dame Ursula Brennan
- Succeeded by: Stephen Lovegrove

Personal details
- Born: 29 December 1964 (age 61) Norwich, Norfolk, England, UK
- Occupation: Civil servant

Sir Jonathan Michael Thompson, KCB (born 29 December 1964) is a British civil servant who served as the Permanent Secretary of the Ministry of Defence (MOD) from September 2012 until April 2016, when he succeeded Dame Lin Homer as Permanent Secretary and Chief Executive of HM Revenue and Customs. He became Chief Executive of the Financial Reporting Council after leaving HMRC in Autumn 2019.

== Background ==
Thompson was born in Norwich, and educated at Earlham High School, Norwich City College and Anglia Polytechnic, which later became Anglia Ruskin University. He became CIPFA qualified in 1989 and CIMA qualified in 2014.

== Career ==
Thompson had various private and public sector roles and became Finance Director for North Somerset Council.

Thompson joined the Civil Service in 2004, as OFSTED’s first finance director. He moved to Department for Education and Skills as their Director-General for Corporate Services in 2006, leaving the then Department for Children, Schools and Families to join the Ministry of Defence (MOD) as Director General of Finance in 2009. Thompson became Permanent Secretary of the MOD in 2012 succeeding Ursula Brennan who moved to the Ministry of Justice. In 2015, he was paid a salary of between £165,000 and £169,999 by the MOD, making him one of the 328 most highly paid people in the British public sector at that time. He then became Chief Executive and First Permanent Secretary of HM Revenue and Customs. Thompson became the Chief Executive of the Financial Reporting Council. in September 2019 and left in March 2023 Thompson became non-executive director on the board of HS2 Ltd. in April 2021 and in February 2023 he became chair of HS2 Ltd until, upon the resignation of CEO Mark Thurston in September 2023, when Thompson took over the running of the company as executive chairman for an interim period.. Thompson left HS2 in March 2025.

Post his career in the public service Sir Jon joined the Board of the Frasers Group Plc in June 2024 and he became Chair of the Board in September 2025. Thompson was appointed Chair of Vocalink, a Mastercard Company in June 2026

Thompson was appointed a Knight Commander of the Order of the Bath (KCB) in the 2019 New Year Honours, "for public service."

== Personal life ==
Thompson married his wife Dawn in 1987 and has three sons and one grandson and one granddaughter. He is a supporter of Norwich City Football Club, and lives in Cambridgeshire.

== Offices held ==
Government offices
Preceded by Dame Ursula Brennan	Permanent Secretary of the Ministry of Defence; 2012–2016	Succeeded by Stephen Lovegrove
Preceded by Dame Lin Homer	Chief Executive of HM Revenue and Customs; 2016–2019	Succeeded by Jim Harra
Business positions
Preceded by Mark Thurston	Executive Chairman (Interim) of High Speed 2 October 2023 - December 2024	Succeeded by Mark Wild
