= Elaine Padmore =

British opera administrator, broadcaster, and author (born 1947)

- Born: Elaine Marguirite Padmore; 1947; Haworth, UK
- Education: University of Birmingham; Guildhall School of Music
- Occupation: opera administrator

Elaine Marguirite Padmore OBE (born 1947) is a British opera administrator, broadcaster, and author. From 2000 until her retirement in 2011, she was Director of Opera at London's Royal Opera House. She was awarded an OBE in the 2012 Birthday Honours List

== Life and career ==
Born in Haworth, Yorkshire, Padmore spent her childhood in Kingston upon Hull where she attended Newland School for Girls and her teenage years in Blackpool where she attended Arnold High School for Girls. She went on to the University of Birmingham, graduating with a Bachelor of Music degree in music. Trained as a singer and also a skilled pianist, while still an undergraduate, she accompanied singers such as Janet Baker and Robert Tear when they sang at the Barber Institute. After post-graduate study at the Guildhall School of Music, she initially worked as a music book editor for Oxford University Press before joining the BBC. At the BBC she rose from being a general music producer for Radio Three to becoming its chief producer of opera.

From 1982 to 1994, Padmore was the General Director of Ireland's Wexford Festival Opera and from 1991 to 1994 concurrently served as the artistic director of Opera Ireland. In 1993 she was appointed artistic director of the Royal Danish Opera, a post which she held until 2000 when she was named Director of Opera at the newly re-opened Royal Opera House in London. She retired in October 2011. The following year she was awarded an OBE "for services to music".

== Publications ==
- "German Expressionist Opera, 1910-1935" (1969). Proceedings of the Royal Musical Association, pp. 41–53
- Wagner (1971). Faber and Faber (Great Composers series for children)
- "Hindemith and Grünewald" (1972). Music Review, Vol. 33, pp. 190–93
