= Jill Bonner =

British-American condensed matter physicist (1937–2021)

Jill Christine Bonner (20 August 1937 – 29 July 2021) was a British-American condensed matter physicist known for her research on the behavior of linear systems of antiferromagnetic particles. She was a professor of physics at the University of Rhode Island.

== Early life and education ==
She attended Newland High School for Girls, a girls' grammar school, where she competed in the 440 yds and at university, being in the top five in the country.

Bonner earned a bachelor's degree in 1959 and a Ph.D. in 1968 at King's College London. There, she was part of the laboratory of Cyril Domb, but her doctoral dissertation, Numerical studies on the linear Ising-Heisenberg model, involved research guided by Michael Fisher. Fisher writes that the idea for their work came from Domb, and that his paper with Bonner became one of his most cited (and hers). Although originally submitted to and published in Physical Review, it received a surprise rejection letter from another journal whose editor, Philip W. Anderson, had been given a preprint by Domb as an example of top current research.

== Career ==
From 1962 through 1967, Bonner was an assistant lecturer and then lecturer in physics at Royal Holloway, University of London. In 1967 she married John F. Nagle, also a physicist at King's College, and moved with him to Carnegie Mellon University in the US, where he had obtained an assistant professorship. Affiliations listed by Bonner in her publications from the early 1970s include Carnegie Mellon and the University of Utah. She filed a formal complaint with Carnegie Mellon University in 1971 regarding a research appointment there, and eventually after "extensive teaching and lecturing experience" became a staff researcher at the Brookhaven National Laboratory. In 1976, she moved from Brookhaven to the University of Rhode Island, hired there as part of a push to improve the university's research profile by new physics department chair Stanley Pickart.

Bonner was Pickart's second choice in his search after an offer to H. Eugene Stanley as full professor fell through; Stanley took a position at more than twice the pay elsewhere. In contrast, Bonner was offered only a visiting assistant professorship, at less than 2/3 of the salary offer made in the unsuccessful attempt to hire Stanley, and (after rejecting this offer as insulting) eventually took a position as visiting associate professor, still for significantly less than the offer to Stanley. In a later class-action lawsuit over discrimination against women at the University of Rhode Island, the court concluded that this experience was part of a pattern in which the existence of a permanent position and the pay for that position depended on the gender of the applicant. Because she was hired, her case was not considered to be convincing evidence of discrimination in hiring. Nevertheless, the outcome of the case was that over 200 female faculty members at the university should receive retroactive pay as damages.

In 1979–1980, Bonner visited Radcliffe College as a Radcliffe Fellow. She was promoted to full professor at the University of Rhode Island in 1981. In 1982, she became one of the first women to win an award in the new National Science Foundation program for Visiting Professorships for Women, which she used to visit Michigan State University.

== Recognition ==
In 1977, Bonner was named a Fellow of the American Physical Society (APS), after a nomination from the APS Division of Condensed Matter Physics with additional support from the APS Forum of International Physics. She was the 1980 winner of the University of Rhode Island's faculty award for scholarly excellence. King's College London gave her an honorary doctorate in 1984.

== Selected publications ==
- Bonner, Jill C.; Fisher, Michael E. (August 1964), "Linear magnetic chains with anisotropic coupling", Physical Review, 135 (3A): A640–A658, Bibcode:1964PhRv..135..640B, doi:10.1103/physrev.135.a640
- Bray, J. W.; Hart, H. R.; Interrante, L. V.; Jacobs, I. S.; Kasper, J. S.; Watkins, G. D.; Wee, S. H.; Bonner, J. C. (September 1975), "Observation of a spin-Peierls transition in a Heisenberg antiferromagnetic linear-chain system", Physical Review Letters, 35 (11): 744–747, Bibcode:1975PhRvL..35..744B, doi:10.1103/physrevlett.35.744
- Müller, Gerhard; Thomas, Harry; Beck, Hans; Bonner, Jill C. (August 1981), "Quantum spin dynamics of the antiferromagnetic linear chain in zero and nonzero magnetic field", Physical Review B, 24 (3): 1429–1467, Bibcode:1981PhRvB..24.1429M, doi:10.1103/physrevb.24.1429
- Bonner, Jill C.; Blöte, Hendrik W. J. (June 1982), "Excitation spectra of the linear alternating antiferromagnet", Physical Review B, 25 (11), American Physical Society ({APS}): 6959–6980, Bibcode:1982PhRvB..25.6959B, doi:10.1103/physrevb.25.6959
- Parkinson, J. B.; Bonner, J. C. (October 1985), "Spin chains in a field: Crossover from quantum to classical behavior", Physical Review B, 32 (7): 4703–4724, Bibcode:1985PhRvB..32.4703P, doi:10.1103/physrevb.32.4703, PMID 9937653
