= Richard Broadbent =

British businessman

- Born: Richard John Broadbent; 22 April 1953 (age 73); Cambridge, England
- Education: QMC London; Manchester University
- Occupation: Businessman
- Years active: 1975–present
- Title: Executive Chairman of HM Customs & Excise (2000–03); Deputy Chairman & Senior Independent Director of Barclays plc (2003–11); Non-executive Chairman of Arriva plc (2004–2010); Non-executive Director and Chairman of Tesco plc (2011–2014)
- Spouse: Dr Jill McLoughlin
- Children: 2

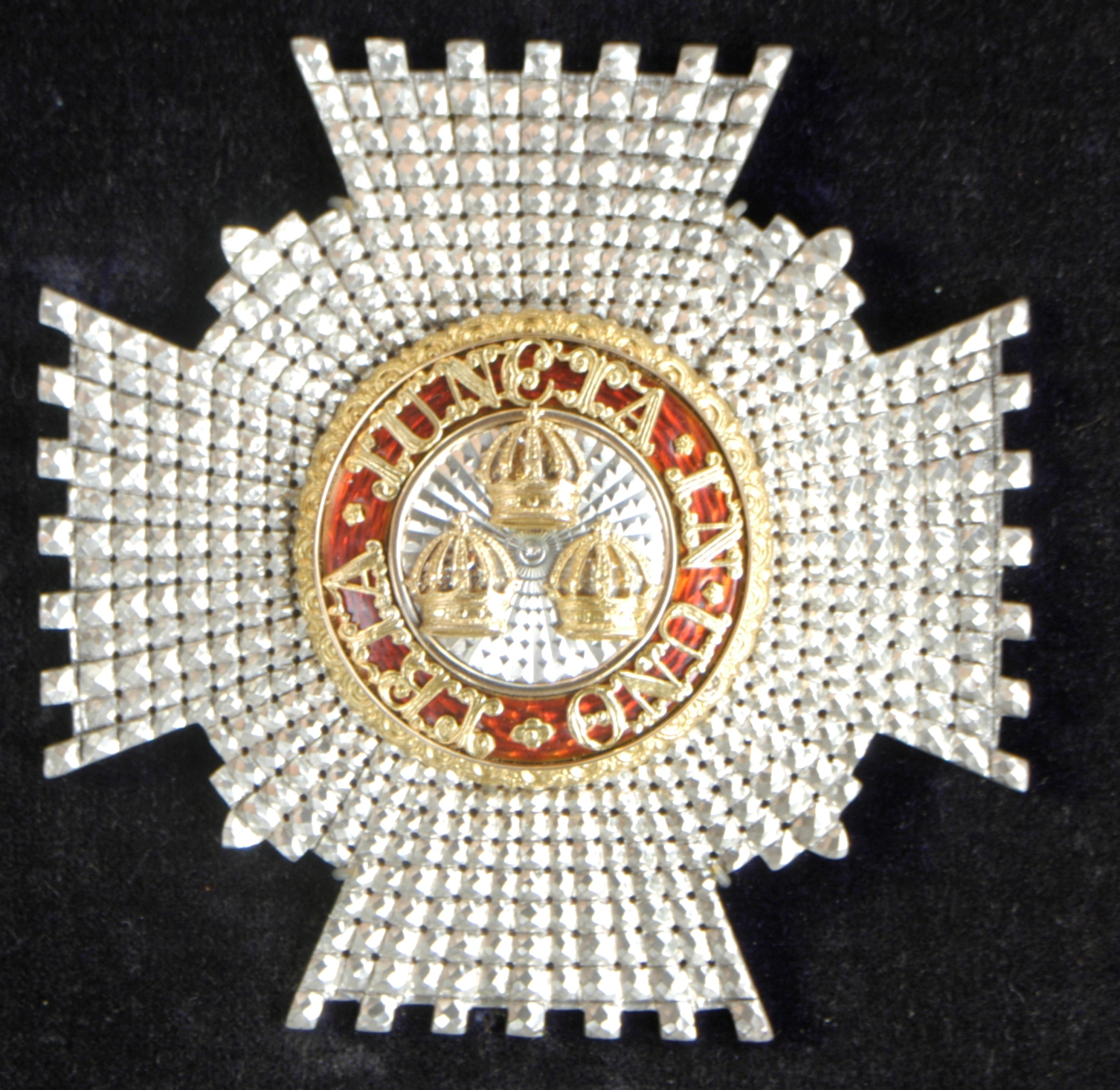
KCB breast star

Sir Richard John Broadbent KCB (born 22 April 1953), is a British businessman, farmer and former civil servant, who serves as chairman of HM Courts and Tribunals Service since 2023.

== Early life ==
Born at Cambridge in 1953 to Professor John Broadbent and Faith née Fisher, he attended the Perse School before going up to Queen Mary College, London (BSc) and pursuing postgraduate studies at Manchester University (MA).

== Career ==
Broadbent joined HM Treasury in 1975, where he served for ten years, including as private secretary under successive Labour and Conservative government ministers. Elected in 1983 a Harkness Fellow at Stanford Business School, in 1986 he joined Schroders investment bank in London.

Appointed head of Schroders' European corporate finance business in 1995, Broadbent led the development of Schroders UK and continental European investment banking business. In 1998, he was promoted global head of corporate finance and a member of the group executive committee, being based in New York until mid 1999 when he left Schroders prior to its sale to Citigroup.

In 2000, he was appointed executive chairman of Her Majesty's Customs and Excise and a member of the Civil Service Management Board. Serving as chairman until 2003, Broadbent oversaw a programme of change management in tax and law enforcement at HMC&E prior to its merger with HM Inland Revenue.

A director of Barclays plc from September 2003, becoming senior independent director in September 2004, Broadbent chaired its board risk committee from 2006 to 2010 and was appointed deputy chairman in 2010. He retired from Barclays' board of directors in 2011.

In July 2004, Broadbent was appointed to the board of Arriva, a European passenger transport business, succeeding as non-executive chairman in November 2004 before stepping down from Arriva's board in August 2010, when the company was sold to Deutsche Bahn.

Appointed to the board of Tesco plc in July 2011, Broadbent was chairman until October 2014. Between 2016 and 2019 he served as chairman of the advisory board and a member of the executive committee of the Dawes Centre for Future Crime at University College London.

A former non-executive director of the Security Institute and a trustee of Relate, he was a partner of the Centre for Compassionate Communication LLP, and is the proprietor and managing director of RB Farms, farming 150 acres in North Norfolk, and chairman of the GSB Trust.

In 2023, Sir Richard was appointed Chairman of HM Courts and Tribunals Service. He is the author of three books: "Choosing Life"; "Know Thyself"; and "The Spirit of Compassionate Communication".

== Personal life ==
Married in 2007 to Dr Jill McLoughlin FRCS, a maxillo-facial surgeon, Sir Richard and Lady Broadbent divide their time between homes in Norfolk and Islington, London N1.

== Honours ==
- KCB, 2003
  - FCSI (MSI, 1995)
  - Freeman of the City of London

=== Arms ===
Coat of arms of Sir Richard Broadbent
Crest In front of a Pheon the Staff rompu a Serpent nowed all Proper Helm That of a Knight Escutcheon Per pale Ermine and Azure a Fess nebuly counterchanged in the dexter chief quarter a Caduceus erect Proper Motto Αιεν Αριστεuειν (To Excel Always) Orders Surrounding the Shield, the Circlet of the Order of the Bath

Government offices
Preceded by Dame Valerie Strachan	Chairman of the Board of Customs and Excise; 2000–2003	Succeeded by Sir David Varney
