= Lin Homer =

British civil servant

Dame Lin Homer DCB
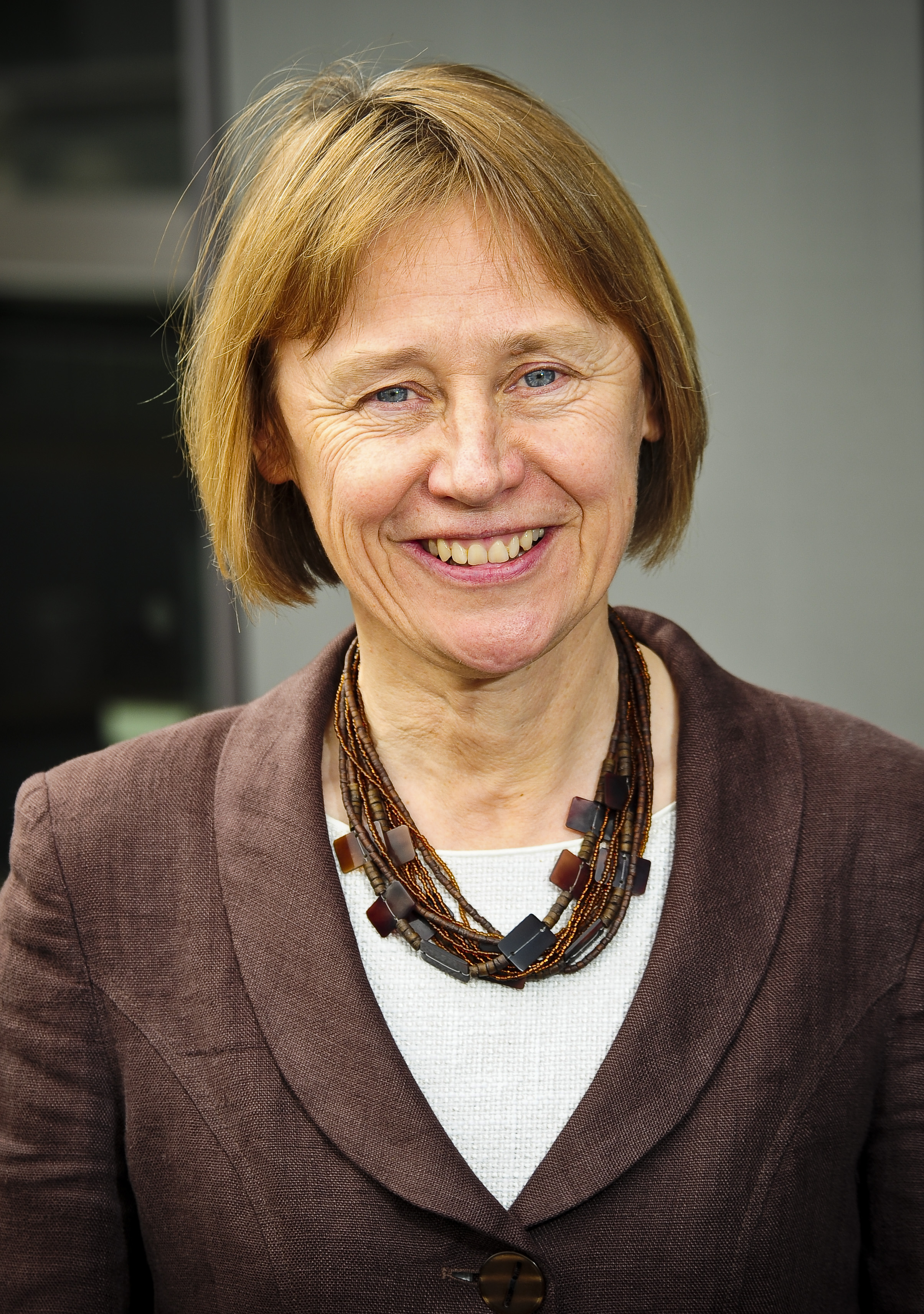
- Lin Homer, July 2013

Permanent Secretary of the Department for Transport
- In office 2011–2011
- Minister: Philip Hammond; Justine Greening
- Preceded by: Robert Devereux
- Succeeded by: Philip Rutnam

Permanent Secretary of HM Revenue and Customs
- In office 2012 – April 2016
- Minister: George Osborne
- Preceded by: Lesley Strathie
- Succeeded by: Jon Thompson

Personal details
- Born: Linda Margaret Homer; 4 March 1957 (age 69) Norfolk, England, UK
- Occupation: Civil servant

Dame Linda Margaret Homer, DCB (born 4 March 1957) is a British retired civil servant who was chief executive of HM Revenue and Customs between 2012 and 2016.

== Early life ==
Homer was born in Sheringham, Norfolk, and educated in Beccles, Suffolk at Sir John Leman High School, where she was head girl. She attended University College London, where she obtained an LLB degree.

== Career ==
Homer qualified as a lawyer in 1980 whilst at Reading Borough Council. In 1982, she joined Hertfordshire County Council where she stayed for 15 years, rising to director of corporate services. She then left to join Suffolk County Council as chief executive in 1998. After four years at Suffolk, Homer went on to be the chief executive of Birmingham City Council in 2002 and joined the civil service in 2005.

In 2005, Homer was criticised by the Election Commissioner for failings in her role as returning officer during a postal vote-rigging scandal involving Labour candidates the previous year, described by the Commissioner as one that "would disgrace a banana republic", and involving hundreds of votes failing to be counted. Homer defended her role to the Election Commission, saying she had been in "strategic, not operational control", and had confined herself to "motivational management and fire fighting".

=== Home Office ===
Homer resigned from her post shortly afterwards, joining the civil service as the Director-General heading the Immigration and Nationality Directorate of the Home Office, in August 2005.

The Home Office was re-organised in 2008, with the formation of the Border and Immigration Agency, later renamed the UK Border Agency, of which Homer became the first chief executive.

In 2013, Homer's tenure at UKBA was criticised for its "catastrophic leadership failure" by the House of Commons Home Affairs Select Committee, which said it had been repeatedly misled by the Agency. Committee chairman Keith Vaz said her performance was "more like the scene of a Whitehall farce than a government agency operating in the 21st century". Homer responded in a letter to the committee, saying that "The suggestion that I deliberately misled the Committee and refused to apologise are both untrue and unfair," adding that "It is therefore wholly inaccurate and unfair to seek to ascribe responsibility to me for matters of concern that occurred long after I left the Agency."

=== Department for Transport ===
In 2010 it was announced that Homer would replace Robert Devereux as Permanent Secretary of the Department for Transport (DfT). While in this role, the DfT oversaw with the controversial franchise letting process for the InterCity West Coast rail franchise that had to be cancelled after significant technical flaws were later discovered in awarding the franchise to FirstGroup. Homer was among officials accused by Richard Branson, head of the Virgin Rail Group, of ignoring concerns about the letting process, whose failure is estimated to have cost £100 million.

=== HM Revenue and Customs ===
In December 2011 it was announced that Homer would succeed Lesley Strathie as Chief Executive of HM Revenue and Customs (HMRC). Homer's appointment to head of HMRC prompted criticism centred on her record in previous positions. However, her appointment was supported by David Gauke, the Exchequer Secretary to the UK Treasury, who said: "She is a highly effective chief executive and the right person to lead HMRC."

In March 2013, HMRC was criticised by the House of Commons Public Accounts Select Committee for its "unambitious and woefully inadequate" response to a report from the UK National Audit Office in December 2012 concerning poor customer service by HMRC.

Homer said the agency had "turned a corner" in dealing with the 79 million calls and 25 million pieces of post received by HMRC each year, having injected £34 million to tackle the problem with that aim of reaching a 90 per cent success rate. As of 2015, Homer was paid a salary of between £185,000 and £189,999 by the department, making her one of the 328 most highly paid people in the British public sector at that time.

On 11 January 2016, Homer announced she would retire from her post as chief executive of HMRC in April of that year. Reviewing her performance following another summons by the Public Accounts Committee, just before retirement, she was nicknamed "Dame Disaster" by The Guardian's John Crace.

She was succeeded by Jon Thompson.

== Honours ==
Homer was appointed Companion of the Order of the Bath (CB) in the 2008 Birthday Honours, and Dame Commander of the Order of the Bath (DCB) in the 2016 New Year Honours.

== Offices held ==
Government offices
Preceded by Peter Bye	Chief Executive; Suffolk County Council; 1998–2002	Succeeded by Mike More
Preceded by Sir Michael Lyons	Chief Executive; Birmingham City Council; 2002–2005	Succeeded by Stephen Hughes
Preceded by Bill Jeffrey	Director-General, Immigration and Nationality Directorate; Home Office; 2005–2008	Succeeded by herself as Chief Executive; Border and Immigration Agency
Preceded by herself as Director-General, Immigration and Nationality Directorate	Chief Executive of the UK Border Agency (previously the Border and Immigration Agency); 2008–2011	Succeeded by Rob Whiteman
Preceded by Robert Devereux	Permanent Secretary of the Department for Transport; 2011–2012	Succeeded by Philip Rutnam
Preceded by Lesley Strathie	Chief Executive of HM Revenue and Customs; 2012–2016	Succeeded by Jon Thompson
