= Param Vir =

British composer originally from India

Param Vir is a British composer, originally from India.

Born in Delhi into a family life permeated with Indian classical music, Param Vir's strong interest in music developed as a teenager when attending a Roman Catholic secondary school and had informal lessons from composer Hans-Joachim Koellreutter, then resident in India. With no prospects as a composer in India, he read history and philosophy at Delhi University, but returned to music on graduation in 1974 as a teacher. From 1983 Vir studied composition at Dartington with Peter Maxwell Davies and at Guildhall School of Music and Drama with Oliver Knussen. In 1986 Vir was a composition fellow at Tanglewood. The following year he was a featured composer in the Festival of India in Geneva.

== Career ==
- 1983 – attended Dartington International Summer School on a scholarship.
- 1984 – moved to London to study with Oliver Knussen.
- 1987 – awarded Benjamin Britten Composition Prize.
- 1993 – Pierre Audi production of Broken Strings wins Ernst von Siemens Music Prize for young composers (Munich).
- 2003 – first full production of ION tours Europe.
- 2005 – Horse Tooth White Rock performed at the BBC Proms.
- 2005 – Hayagriva commissioned and premiered by the Schoenberg Ensemble in Amsterdam
- 2006 – Between Earth and Sky, inspired by Anish Kapoor's Cloud Gate, premiered by the BBC Symphony Orchestra in London
- 2008 – He Begins His Great Trance for the BBC Singers; Black Feather Rising for Stichting Octopus
- 2010 – Constellations for the BCMG performed at the Barbican
- 2013 – BBC Proms Commission Cave of Luminous Mind
- 2014 – Raga Fields – co-commission from Klangforum Wien, Fulcrum Point Chicago, the BCMG
- 2017 – international tour of A Kinsman to Danger
- 2020 – awarded PRS Composer Award for portrait CD on NMC

== Selected works ==
=== Stage works ===
Premiere	Title	Description	Libretto and source
11 May 1992, De Nederlandse Opera, Amsterdam	Snatched by the Gods	Opera in one act, 55'	William Radice, after the poem Debatar Gras by Rabindranath Tagore
11 May 1992, De Nederlandse Opera, Amsterdam	Broken Strings	Opera in one act, 60'. (revised 1995)	David Rudkin, after an ancient Buddhist tale Guttil Jatak
09 Jun 2000, Aldeburgh Festival / Almeida Opera	ION	Opera in 4 scenes with Prologue, 120'	David Lan, after Euripides
24 Oct 2008, De Toneelschuur, Haarlem	Black Feather Rising	Music Theatre for 2 Singers and 6 Instrumentalists, 90'	David Rudkin, after folklore collection Healers on the Mountain by Teresa Pijoan

=== Other ===
- Before Krishna (1987; string orchestra)
- Horse Tooth White Rock (1994; orchestra)
- Ultimate Words: Infinite Song (1997; baritone, six percussion, piano)
- The Theatre of Magical Beings (2003; large ensemble)
- Hayagriva (2005; large ensemble)
- Between Earth and Sky (2006; orchestra)
- Cave of Luminous Mind (2013; orchestra) BBC commission for 2013 Proms
- ABLAZE! (2014, soprano, piano)
- Raga Fields (2014, sarod, mixed ensemble)
- Drum of the Deathless (2017, percussion quintet or percussion duo)
- A Kinsman to Danger (2017, baritone, piano)
