= William Radice =

British poet, writer and translator (1951–2024)

- Born: 1951; London, England
- Died: 10 November 2024 (aged 73); England
- Occupations: Writer, poet, translator
- Children: 2
- Relatives: Betty Radice (mother)
- Writing career
- Subjects: Poetry, Bengali literature, Rabindranath Tagore,

William Radice (1951 – 10 November 2024) was a British poet, writer and translator. His research area was in Bengali language and literature, and he was the senior lecturer in Bengali in the School of Oriental and African Studies at the University of London. He translated several Bengali works, and works by Rabindranath Tagore and Michael Madhusudan Dutt.

Radice adapted the text Debotar Grash by Rabindranath Tagore as an opera libretto, which was set to music by Param Vir as Snatched by the Gods. He wrote the libretto for a children's opera Chincha-Chancha Cooroo or The Weaver's Wedding with music by Bernard Hughes.

He published nine volumes of poetry ranging from Eight Sections (1974), Strivings (1980), Louring Skies (1985) and Gifts (2002) to his latest two books This Theatre Royal (2004) and Green, Red, Gold, a novel in 101 sonnets (2005) which were hailed by A. N. Wilson in The Daily Telegraph as stunning. He has also fore-worded a collection of translated Tagore poems, Soaring High, written by Mira Rani Devi.

In 2002, he published the voluminous (784 pages) Myths and Legends of India, a collection of 112 of his own retellings with selections from P. Lal's ongoing transcreation of the Mahabharata. Along with the major Hindu myths, he included legends and folk tales from Muslim, Buddhist, Jain, Syrian Christian and tribal sources.

His mother was the editor and translator Betty Radice. William Radice died from cancer in England, on 10 November 2024, at the age of 73.

== Major publications ==
William Radice's main publications include:

- Eight Sections (poems, Secker & Warburg, London, 1974)
- Strivings (poems, Anvil Press, London, 1980)
- The Stupid Tiger and Other Tales (tr. from Bengali, Andre Deutsch, London, 1981, 1988; Rupa & Co., Calcutta, 1987; HarperCollins, Delhi, 2000)
- Louring Skies (poems, Anvil Press, London, 1985)
- Selected Poems, 1970–81 (Writers Workshop, Calcutta, 1987)
- Rabindranath Tagore: Selected Poems (tr., Penguin, 1985, rev. 1987; new ed., 1995; Penguin India, 1995)
- The Translator's Art: Essays in Honour of Betty Radice (ed. with Barbara Reynolds, Penguin, 1987)
- Char Baktrita ('Four Lectures', Bangla Academy, Dhaka, 1990)
- Rabindranath Tagore: Selected Short Stories (tr., Penguin, 1991, rev. 1994; Penguin India, 1995) + Cuentos (tr. Angel Garcia Galiano, Madrid: PPC, 1996) and L'esquelet i altres narracions (tr. Marta Marín, Barcelona: Editorial Empúries, 2002)
- Sakuntala (ed., Folio Society, London, 1992)
- Snatched by the Gods, a libretto based on Tagore for an opera by Param Vir (Novello, London, 1992)
- Rozsa Hajnoczy: Fire of Bengal (tr. from Hungarian by David Grant & Eva Wimmer, ed., University Press Ltd., Dhaka, 1993)
- Juan Mascaró: The Creation of Faith/La Creació de la Fe (ed., Editorial Moll, Palma de Mallorca, 1994; Rupa & Co., Delhi, 1995; Bayeux Arts, Calgary, 1999)
- The Retreat (poems, University Press Ltd., Dhaka, 1994)
- Teach Yourself Bengali (Hodder & Stoughton, London, 1994)
- Martin Kämpchen: The Honey-seller and Other Stories (tr. from German, Rupa & Co., Delhi, 1995)
- Before and After (poems, Writers Workshop, Calcutta, 1995)
- Rabindranath Tagore: The Post Office (play, tr., The Tagore Centre UK, 1995)
- The One and the Many, readings from Tagore with photographs by John Berridge (ed., Bayeux Arts, Calgary, 1997)
- Swami Vivekananda and the Modernisation of Hinduism (ed., OUP, Delhi, 1997, 1999)
- Particles, Jottings, Sparks: The Collected Brief Poems of Rabindranath Tagore (HarperCollins, Delhi, 2000; Angel Books, London, 2001)
- Myths and Legends of India (retold by W.R., Folio Society, London, 2001; Penguin India, 2002)
- Gifts: Poems 1992–1999 (Grevatt & Grevatt, Newcastle upon Tyne, 2002)
- Sigfrid Gauch: Traces of My Father (tr. from German, Northwestern University Press, Illinois, 2002)
- A Hundred Letters from England ( Indialog Publications, New Delhi, 2003)
- Poetry and Community: Lectures and Essays 1991–2001 (DC Publishers, Delhi, 2003)
- Beauty, Be My Brahman: Indian Poems (Writers Workshop, Kolkata, 2004)
