= Betty Radice =

- Born: 3 January 1912; Hessle, Yorkshire
- Died: 19 February 1985 (aged 73); London
- Occupations: Editor and translator
- Relatives: William Radice (son)

Betty Radice (3 January 1912 – 19 February 1985) was a literary editor and translator. She became joint editor of Penguin Classics, and vice-president of the Classical Association. She produced numerous English translations of classical and medieval Latin texts which were published in the mid-twentieth century.

== Biography ==
Born Betty Dawson in Hessle, East Yorkshire on 13 January 1912, she was the daughter of William Dawson, a solicitor who was a scholar and musician and active in public life. William died in the 1918 flu pandemic, leaving her mother, Betty, sister Nancy and a brother in diminished circumstances. Both girls attended Newland School for Girls in Hull.

She was granted a scholarship to St Hilda's College, Oxford, where she read Classics beginning in 1931.

In 1935, she married Italo de Lisle Radice, whom she had met as an undergraduate. Together they relocated to London where Betty tutored in classics, Philosophy and English for Westminster Tutors and de Lisle began a civil service career. The couple had five children, Thomas, Catherine, Teresa, William and John. Teresa died in infancy and Catherine died from lupus erythematosus in 1968. Radice became a teacher of classics from this time.

From 1959 she became an assistant to E.V. Rieu, one of the founders of the series of translations, Penguin Classics, which had begun in 1946 with Rieu's translation of Homer's Odyssey. When Rieu retired in 1964, she and Robert Baldick succeeded him as joint editors. When Baldick died in 1972 and his successor C. A. Jones died in 1974, Radice became the sole editor of the series. She spent 21 years as editor of Penguin Classics.

She died on 19 February 1985, of a heart attack.

Her son, William Radice, an academic at the School of Oriental and African Studies at the University of London, was a scholar of Bengali language and literature. Two years after her death, a Festschrift honouring Radice was published by Penguin, edited by William Radice and Barbara Reynolds.

== Scholarship ==
In her association with Penguin Classics, Betty Radice worked as both an editor and a translator. Her editing was said to be "imaginative and open-minded, forever on the look-out for the new, the fresh, the surprising and the original". When it came to translating verse, although her mentor E.V. Rieu did not believe that poetry could be reproduced in other languages and so favoured prose translations, Radice herself preferred verse translations and under her editorship this became the norm.

Her son William noted that she found translation challenging, writing in 1974, "...nothing in my experience involves so much drudgery, minute application, exasperation at being tied to another's thought processes."

Her works include:

- The Letters of the Younger Pliny
- The Letters of Abelard and Heloise
- Rome and Italy: Books VI-X of the History of Rome from Its Foundation by Livy
- The Comedies by Terence
- Who's Who in the Ancient World
- Phormio & Other Plays by Terence
- Praise of Folly by Erasmus

=== Festschrift ===
- The Translator's Art: Essays in Honour of Betty Radice, edited by William Radice and Barbara Reynolds (Harmondsworth: Penguin, 1987)
