= Edward Troup (solicitor) =

British tax lawyer and civil servant

Sir Edward Troup
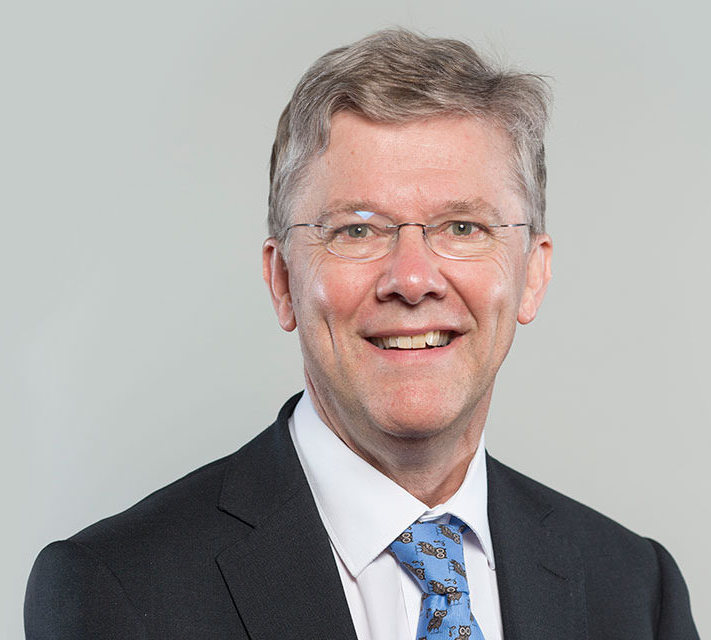
- Troup in 2017
- Born: John Edward Astley Troup; 26 January 1955 (age 71); Reading, Berkshire, England
- Education: Oundle School
- Alma mater: Corpus Christi College, Oxford
- Spouse: Siriol Jane Martin (m. 1978)
- Children: 4

Sir John Edward Astley Troup (born 26 January 1955) is a British tax lawyer, and was a civil servant at HM Treasury and then HM Revenue & Customs. He spent two periods as a tax partner at the law firm Simmons & Simmons, from 1985 to 1995 and from 1997 to 2004, and was a special adviser to Kenneth Clarke as Chancellor of the Exchequer in 1995-97.

He rejoined HM Treasury in 2004, and became Executive Chair and First Permanent Secretary of the HM Revenue and Customs (HMRC) in April 2016. He retired in December 2017, and was knighted in the 2018 New Year Honours.

== Early and private life ==
Born in Reading, Troup is the son of Cordelia Mary (née Hope) and Vice-Admiral Sir Anthony Troup. His father was the youngest British naval officer to command a submarine in World War II, aged 21 in June 1943, and he was later the last Commander-in-Chief, Far East Fleet. Before his retirement, Anthony Troup was Flag Officer Submarines and then Flag Officer Scotland and Northern Ireland.

Troup was educated at Oundle School until 1972, and then studied mathematics at Corpus Christi College, Oxford, graduating with a BA in 1976 and an MSc in 1977.

He married Siriol Jane Martin in 1978. They have four children.

== Legal career ==
He joined Simmons & Simmons in 1979, qualifying as a solicitor in 1981, and became an Associate of the Chartered Institute of Taxation in 1983. He became a Freeman at the Worshipful Company of Grocers in 1980. According to The Guardian in April 2016, "Troup ... built a career advising corporations on how to reduce their tax bills".

From 1985 to 1995, Troup was a tax partner at Simmons & Simmons. He joined the Treasury as a special adviser to Chancellor of the Exchequer Kenneth Clarke and returned to Simmons & Simmons as its head of tax strategy after the 1997 general election. Shortly afterwards, Troup wrote a series of Personal View commentaries for the Financial Times, including one titled "Double trouble over tax" on the problems caused because the UK has two separate tax authorities, the Inland Revenue and HM Customs & Excise, and the advantages of merging them. Another piece, Right result, wrong reasons, considering the reasons to abolishing tax credits on dividends. Why the chancellor is missing the point, on the flaws in the tax system and the importance of the rule of law in taxation, in which he expressed the opinion that "tax avoidance is not a moral issue" and described tax itself as "legalised extortion". Troup's article of 15 July 1997 was criticized by Richard Murphy of the Tax Justice Network in 2013.

Faith in a general anti-avoidance provision is based on a lack of understanding of the real nature of tax avoidance. The popular idea is too often confused with the claim that "tax avoiders are paying less tax than they should", even though is no objective way of determining how much they "should" be paying. Tax law does not codify some Platonic set of tax-raising principles. Taxation is legalised extortion and is valid only to the extent of the law. ...

The issue of tax avoidance is real and important, but it cannot be considered in isolation from wider questions of the structure and direction of the tax system as a whole.

— "Why the chancellor is missing the point", Personal view: Edward Troup, Financial Times, 15 July 1997.

Appearing before the Treasury Select Committee on the subject of tax havens in 1999, as the Organisation for Economic Co-operation and Development began to take measures with regards to offshore companies, Troup immediately had to declare an interest with regards to the Code of Conduct, saying: "In relation to the offshore jurisdictions, [I am involved with] assisting them [and] putting their representations to the OECD". Asked if tax havens "mobilise capital which would not otherwise get itself mobilised and so increase international economic activity", Troup replied that "If it did not assist people would not pay for the use of those jurisdictions and those centres. My intuitive response must be yes, it does assist tremendously... It is difficult to see the world without many of these jurisdictions", adding "it is very difficult for UK residents or companies actually to reduce their tax bill legitimately through any offshore means".

Troup advised on the management buyout of part of hedge fund Man Group in 2000, commenting that "achieving a tax-efficient structure in the context of a buyout involving businesses and shareholders round the world posed some interesting challenges". The new business owners of the company ended up holding their shares through a trust company in Jersey.

== Civil servant ==
Troup returned to HM Treasury in 2004 as Director of Business and Indirect Tax, and became Director General of Tax and Welfare at HM Treasury in 2010. In March 2016, Private Eye characterized Troup's time in the Treasury as including a series of relaxations to laws regarding multinational corporations and alleged tax havens.

He succeeded David Hartnett as the Tax Assurance Commissioner and Second Permanent Secretary at HMRC in September 2012. The last months of Hartnett's career were tainted with allegations of "sweetheart deals" involving Vodafone and Goldman Sachs. Troup was appointed as Executive Chair and First Permanent Secretary at HMRC from April 2016.

It was announced in September 2017 that Troup would retire from HMRC at the end of the year.

Troup was appointed a Knight Bachelor in the 2018 New Year Honours for "public service to taxpayers and the tax system".

== 2019 comments and advisory work ==
In 2019, Troup spoke to the Resolution Foundation, where he said that baby boomers were an "under-taxed generation", and criticised free television licences for the over-75s in the UK.

In April 2024, the shadow chancellor Rachel Reeves announced that Troup was part of her advisory team on tax avoidance.
