= Office of Government Commerce =

Former UK Government Office

Office of Government Commerce Logo

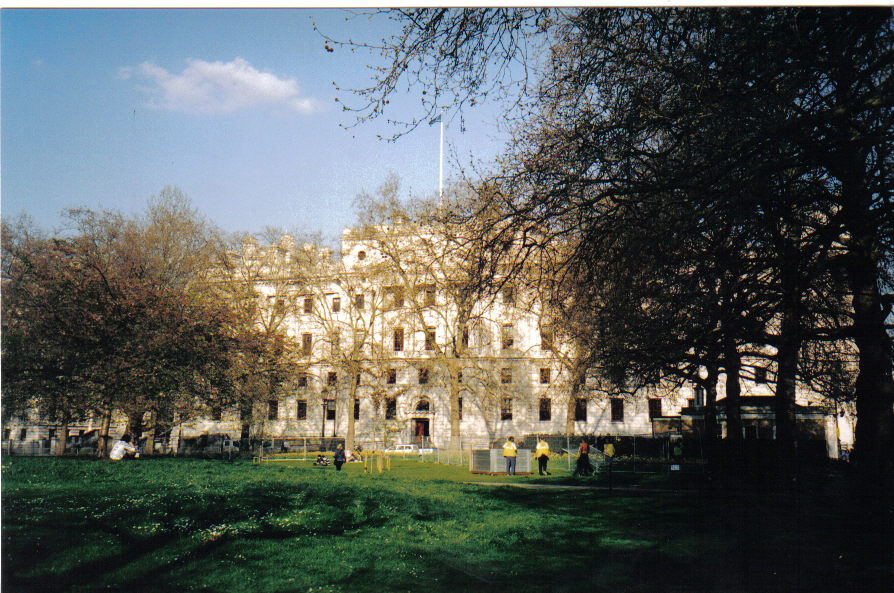
1 Horse Guards Road, Office's Headquarters

The Office of Government Commerce (OGC) was a UK Government Office established as part of HM Treasury in 2000. It was moved into the Efficiency and Reform Group of the Cabinet Office in 2010, before being closed in 2011.

== Overview ==
A Review of Civil Procurement in Central Government was undertaken by Peter Gershon, then a company director, which had been requested in November 1998 by the Paymaster General and the Parliamentary Secretary to the Cabinet Office and was published in April 1999. This review recommended the establishment of a central procurement organisation within central government, which Gershon called the Office of Government Commerce. He noted in his report that the review had been initiated because of the then-Prime Minister Tony Blair's interest in a Ministerial Cabinet Committee report on Public Expenditure published the previous April.

The OGC operated through the Government Procurement Service, an executive agency now known as the Crown Commercial Service.

The purpose of the OGC was to support the procurement and acquisition process of public sector organisations in the UK through policy and process guidance and the negotiation of overarching service and provision frameworks. This was intended to improve value for money to the taxpayer, optimising the level of taxpayers equity directed towards the delivery of services. Similar organisations can be found in most western European countries, for instance Hansel Ltd. in Finland and Consip in Italy.

The OGC supported initiatives to encourage better supplier relations, sustainable procurement, the benefits of utilising smaller suppliers and the potential of eProcurement. Representing the UK at the European Union (EU), the organisation assisted with the public sector application of EU procurement rules within the United Kingdom.

== Kelly Programme ==
In December 2003 Sir Christopher Kelly wrote for the OGC a Report to the Chancellor of the Exchequer: Increasing Competition and Improving Long-Term Capacity Planning in the Government Market Place, with an accompanying Action Plan, which included several findings related to the government’s ability to approach the market as a unified, knowledgeable client. An aim of the report was "to consider what further steps can be taken to increase competition and encourage better long-term capacity planning in markets where the Government possesses significant purchasing power". In response the OGC mandated its Government Marketplace Division to focus on implementing the report's recommendations by undertaking research on projected demand and supply to produce proposals for more strategic management of public sector procurement in specific markets; making improvements to two-way communication in the marketplace; and issuing guidance on market creation to stimulate competition. This programme of work has been referred to as the "Kelly Programme".

== Best practice models ==
The organisation used to act as sponsor for best practices in project, programme, risk and service management:

- Managing Successful Programmes (MSP)
- Projects in Controlled Environments (PRINCE2)
- Management of Risk (M_o_R)
- Portfolio Management (MoP)
- Value Management (MoV)
- Information Technology Infrastructure Library (ITIL)
- Portfolio, Programme and Project Offices (P3O)

These areas of best practice are now owned jointly by the UK government and Capita, being managed by Axelos.

== International role ==
The OGC was a member of Procurement G6, an informal group leading the use of framework agreements and e-procurement instruments in public procurement.

== Logo ==
The problematic logo.

On 24 April 2008 it was reported in the Daily Telegraph that a new logo for OGC had been introduced at the cost of £14,000. The logo caused embarrassment to the organisation due to its unintended sexual suggestiveness (appearing to show a man masturbating) when rotated 90° clockwise. A spokesman for OGC said, "It is not inappropriate to an organisation that's looking to have a firm grip on Government spend."
