= HMRC Strengthened Reward Scheme =

HM Revenue and Customs Welsh: Cyllid a Thollau Ei Fawrhydi

Agency overview
- Formed: 18 April 2005; 21 years ago
- Preceding agencies: Inland Revenue; HM Customs and Excise
- Employees: 63,645 FTE
- Annual budget: £7.4 billion (2023–24)

Jurisdictional structure
- Operations jurisdiction: United Kingdom
- Constituting instrument: Commissioners for Revenue and Customs Act 2005
- Specialist jurisdictions: Customs, excise, gambling; Taxation

Operational structure
- Headquarters: 100 Parliament Street, Westminster, London, England
- Elected officer responsible: James Murray, Exchequer Secretary to the Treasury and Departmental Minister for HMRC
- Agency executives: John-Paul Marks, Chief Executive; Angela MacDonald, Deputy Chief Executive
- Child agency: Valuation Office Agency

His Majesty’s Revenue and Customs’ (HMRC) new "Strengthened Reward Scheme" intends to encourage anti-fraud whistleblowing by providing larger financial incentives. The program is modeled after the US IRS Whistleblower Program, which allows individuals to come forward with information about tax fraud, help the government recover money that should have been collected under tax laws, and receive a share of the recovery as a reward.

In the 2023-2024 fiscal year, the difference between tax amount owed and the amount collected was £46.8 billion. The disparity, commonly referred to as the “tax gap”, was a significant factor behind the HMRC’s updated program. The program is targeted at non-compliance in major tax evasion cases, usually involving offshore or avoidance schemes, wealthy individuals, or large corporations.

== History of HMRC Whistleblower Program ==
Prior to the 2025 program, whistleblower policy in the UK and the HMRC existed, but lacked a formalized financial reward structure. The earliest iteration of these policies is the Employment Rights Act 1996 (ERA), which establishes the framework for general employment rights. While the rights laid out by the ERA did not apply specifically to whistleblowing, many of the guidelines it established, such as unfair dismissal and protection from detriment, have since been utilized in shaping whistleblower policy.

The Public Interest Disclosure Act 1998 (PIDA) was the first UK law that specifically aimed to support and protect whistleblowing. An amendment to the ERA, the act states that workers can not be subjected to detriment on the grounds that the worker has made a “protected disclosure”. Under Section 43B of PIDA, a protected disclosure is any disclosure of information (rather than allegation or opinion) which the worker reasonably believes shows any of the following:

- That a criminal offence has been committed;
- A legal obligation has not been complied with;
- A miscarriage of justice has occurred;
- Health or safety has been endangered;
- The environment has been damaged;
- Or that any such matter has been deliberately concealed.

The Enterprise and Regulatory Reform Act 2013 revised PIDA, clarifying that disclosures were not protected unless believed to be made in the public interest.

Despite expanded legal protections under PIDA, financial incentives for whistleblowers remained limited. At the time, rewards were completely discretionary, meaning the HMRC was not required to provide a reward for the whistleblower even if their information resulted in significant financial recovery. In the 2024-2025 tax year, HMRC reported £852,483 in rewards, compared to £978,256 the previous year. The International Whistleblower Advocates (IWA) has described these incentives as “minuscule” comparatively to the tax gap, which the HMRC has estimated to be around 5.3% annually.

The Strengthened Rewards Scheme was announced during the 2025 Budget Statement in the House of Commons by Rachel Reeves, the UK chancellor of the exchequer. According to the IWA, many of the policies outlined in the program are modelled on the IRS Whistleblower Program, including a reward range of 15-30% of the tax collected, no upper cap on potential rewards, and guidelines that aim to explicitly describe what constitutes a qualifying disclosure. The program applies to cases exceeding £1.5 million in unpaid tax and includes provisions for individuals with information regarding offshore and corporate schemes.

Though announced on November 26, 2025, the program will not take effect until April 6, 2026.

== Program aspects ==
The program gives whistleblowers the opportunity to qualify for a reward between 15-30% of the total tax collected, as long as their information leads to collections of at least £1.5 million. HMRC is primarily targeting high-value fraud with this stipulation, citing large companies, wealthy individuals, and offshore or avoidance schemes as likely to be involved with evasion of this size. While reward totals will be tied to recovery, there is no limit on potential rewards.

Contrary to the IRS Whistleblower Program, rewards will remain discretionary even if the threshold of £1.5 million is met. According to Whistleblower Network News (WNN), while the new correlation between collection totals and awards will resolve the inconsistent award payments, the lack of guarantee contradicts what WNN describes as one of the more crucial aspects of the US program. WNN believes that the lack of incentive combined with the recent decline in payouts will create uncertainty around the UK’s commitment to whistleblower rewards.

== Reporting ==
In order to qualify for a reward, informants’ information must lead to the collection of at least £1.5 million.

=== Disqualifications ===
Whistleblowers may not qualify for a reward if:

- They received the information while they were a civil servant (or contracted to work in the government);
- They are the taxpayer involved in the evasion or started the actions that resulted in evasion or avoidance;
- The information provided may already be known to HMRC or could have been identified through routine processes;
- The reward may lead to funding illegal activity, or they were required by law to disclose (or not disclose) the information;
- They are acting on behalf of someone else, or they are reporting on behalf of someone who is not eligible for the reward;
- Or they are anonymously reporting the information. While submissions may be provided anonymously, a whistleblower will be required to provide their name prior to receiving an award.

=== Submission Requirements ===
In submitting a report, whistleblowers must include the following: the type of activity being reported, how they know about it, their relationship to the business or individual, duration of the avoidance, estimated total value of the activity, and any supporting information. Prior to the report, whistleblowers must not try to obtain more information about the activity, alert anyone of their report, or encourage criminal activity to obtain more information.

HMRC will notify individuals that their report has been received, and individuals will be contacted if more information is required or if they are eligible for a reward. Repeated reports concerning the same activity are not permitted, nor is inquiry about a current report. Investigations are lengthy, and the HMRC states that there could be years between the report and any reward payment.

== Determination ==
If HMRC determines that an informant’s tip is worth pursuing, they will investigate the corporation or individual. Once the unpaid tax is collected, the whistleblower will become eligible for a reward as long as the amount meets or exceeds £1.5 million and could not have been recovered without their information. HMRC is not required to provide a reward, however, as they remain discretionary under the Strengthened Rewards Scheme.
