= Mike Clasper =

British former chairman of Coats Group plc (born 1953)

Mike Clasper CBE
- Born: Michael Clasper; 21 April 1953 (age 73); Sunderland, England
- Education: St John's College, Cambridge
- Occupation: Businessman

Michael Clasper CBE (born 21 April 1953) is the British former chairman of Coats Group plc (formerly Guinness Peat Group plc (GPG)) and the former chairman of Her Majesty's Revenue and Customs (HMRC) (2008-2012).

== Education ==
He has an MA in Engineering from St John's College, Cambridge University.

== Career ==
- 1974 Graduate Trainee of British Rail
- 1978 Graduate Trainee, Brand Manager and then Associate Advertising Manager, Procter & Gamble, UK
- 1985 Advertising Director, Procter & Gamble, UK
- 1989 General Manager, Procter & Gamble, Holland
- 1991 Vice President and Managing Director, Procter & Gamble, UK/Eire
- 1995 Regional Vice President, Procter & Gamble, European Fabric and Homecare
- 1998 President, Procter & Gamble, European Fabric and Homecare
- 1999 President, Procter & Gamble, Global Home Care and New Business Development, Brussels
- 2001 Deputy Chief Executive, LHR Airports Ltd
- 2003 Group Chief Executive Officer, LHR Airports Ltd
- 2006 Operational Managing Director, Terra Firma Capital Partners Ltd
- 2008 - 2012 Chairman, HM Revenue and Customs
- 2013 Non-Executive Chairman, Coats plc
- 2014 Chairman of Guinness Peat Group plc
- 2014 President of Chartered Management Institute
