= HM Revenue and Customs =

Non-ministerial department of the UK Government

HM Revenue and Customs Welsh: Cyllid a Thollau Ei Fawrhydi

Agency overview
- Formed: 18 April 2005; 21 years ago
- Preceding agencies: Inland Revenue; HM Customs and Excise
- Employees: 63,645 FTE
- Annual budget: £7.4 billion (2023–24)

Jurisdictional structure
- Operations jurisdiction: United Kingdom
- Constituting instrument: Commissioners for Revenue and Customs Act 2005
- Specialist jurisdictions: Customs, excise, gambling; Taxation

Operational structure
- Headquarters: 100 Parliament Street, Westminster, London, England
- Elected officer responsible: Daniel Tomlinson, Exchequer Secretary to the Treasury and Departmental Minister for HMRC
- Agency executives: John-Paul Marks, chief executive; Angela MacDonald, deputy chief executive

Website
- www.gov.uk/government/organisations/hm-revenue-customs

His Majesty's Revenue and Customs (commonly known as HMRC) is a department of the UK government responsible for the collection of taxes, the payment of some forms of state support, the administration of other regulatory regimes including the national minimum wage, and the issuance of national insurance numbers.

HMRC was formed by the merger of the Inland Revenue and HM Customs and Excise, which took effect on 18 April 2005. The department's logo is the Tudor Crown enclosed within a circle.

== Departmental responsibilities ==
HMRC is one of the largest UK government departments. The department is responsible for the administration and collection of direct taxes including Income Tax, Corporation Tax, Capital Gains Tax (CGT) and Inheritance Tax (IHT), indirect taxes including Value Added Tax (VAT), excise duties and Stamp Duty Land Tax (SDLT), and environmental taxes such as Air Passenger Duty and the Climate Change Levy. Other aspects of the department's responsibilities include National Insurance Contributions (NIC), the distribution of Child Benefit and some other forms of state support including the Child Trust Fund, enforcement of the National Minimum Wage, administering anti-money laundering registrations for Money Service Businesses and collection and publication of the trade-in-goods statistics. Responsibility for the protection of the UK's borders passed to the UK Border Agency within the Home Office on 1 April 2008 and then to UK Border Force and the National Crime Agency in 2013; however, HMRC officers are also regularly deployed at the border to assist on operations.

HMRC is also a law enforcement agency, responsible for investigating and tackling tax fraud, excise (tobacco & alcohol) fraud, smuggling, money laundering and a number of other types of offences against the Treasury. The criminal investigation department, known as Fraud Investigation Service (FIS), is part of its Customer Compliance Group.

== Powers of officers ==
HMRC has a cadre of criminal investigators responsible for investigating Serious Organised Fiscal Crime. This includes all of the previous Customs criminal work (other than drug trafficking, but used to include this up until 2008) such as tobacco, alcohol, and oil smuggling. They have aligned their previous Customs and Excise powers to tackle previous Inland Revenue criminal offences. Fraud Investigation Service are responsible for seizing (or preventing the loss of) billions of stolen pounds of HMG's revenue. Their skills and resources include the full range of intrusive and covert surveillance and they are a senior partner in the Organised Crime Partnership Board.

HMRC's criminal investigation department is the Fraud Investigation Service (FIS). Officers deployed in their criminal investigation teams have the same powers as police officers, and have wide-ranging powers of arrest, entry, search and detention. HMRC have the power to apply for orders requiring information to be produced; apply for and execute search warrants; make arrests; search suspects and premises following arrest; and recover criminal assets through the Proceeds of Crime Act 2002. They also have extensive surveillance powers that authorised criminal investigation officers are trained to utilise.

The main power, exercised under section 138 of the Customs and Excise Management Act 1979 (as amended by section 114 of the Police and Criminal Evidence Act 1984), is to arrest anyone who has committed, or whom the officer has reasonable grounds to suspect has committed, any offence under the Customs and Excise Acts as well as related fraud offences.

On 30 June 2006, under the authority of the new Labour home secretary, John Reid, extensive new powers were given to HMRC. Under chairman Sir David Varney, a new Criminal Taxes Unit of senior tax investigators was created to target suspected fraudsters and criminal gangs. To disrupt and clamp down on criminal activity. This HMRC/CTU would pursue suspects in the same way the US Internal Revenue Service caught out Al Capone on tax evasion. These new powers included the ability to impose penalties without needing to prove the guilt of suspected criminals; extra powers to use sophisticated surveillance techniques, and for the first time, to have the same ability as customs officers to monitor suspects and arrest them. On 19 July 2006, the executive chairman of HMRC, Sir David Varney resigned.

HMRC is also listed under parts of the British government which contribute to intelligence collection, analysis and assessment. Their prosecution cases may be co-ordinated with the police or the Crown Prosecution Service.

== History ==
The merger of the Inland Revenue and HM Customs & Excise was announced by then chancellor of the Exchequer Gordon Brown in the budget on 17 March 2004. The name for the new department and its first executive chairman, David Varney, were announced on 9 May 2004. Varney joined the nascent department in September 2004, and staff started moving from Somerset House and New Kings Beam House into HMRC's new headquarters building at 100 Parliament Street in Whitehall on 21 November 2004.

The planned new department was announced formally in the Queen's Speech of 2004 and a bill, the Commissioners for Revenue and Customs Bill, was introduced into the House of Commons on 24 September 2004, and received royal assent as the Commissioners for Revenue and Customs Act 2005 on 7 April 2005. The Act also creates a Revenue and Customs Prosecutions Office (RCPO) responsible for the prosecution of all Revenue and Customs cases.

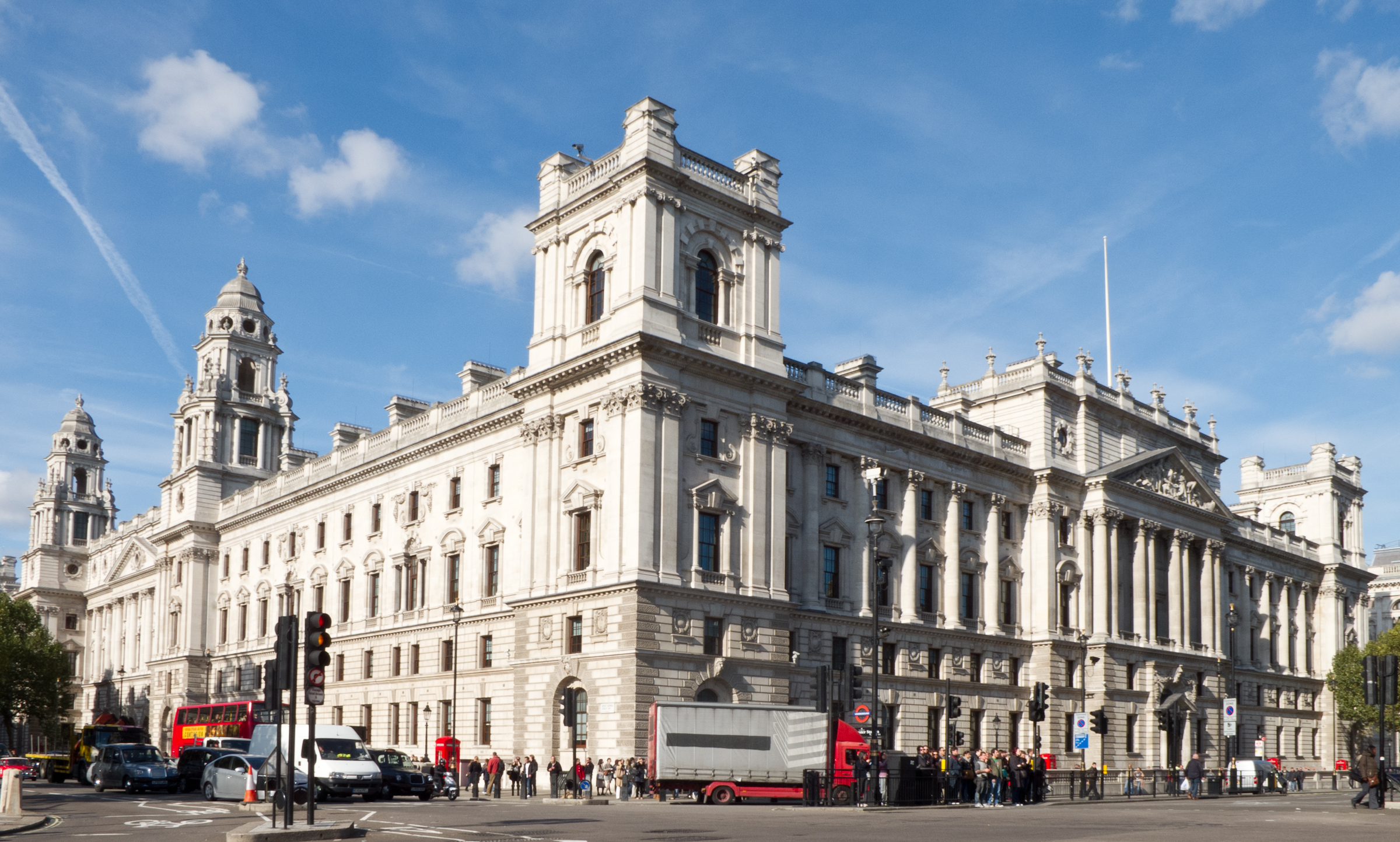
Headquarters are at 100 Parliament Street, Westminster

The old Inland Revenue and Customs & Excise departments had very different historical bases, internal cultures and legal powers. The merger was described by the Financial Times on 9 July 2004, as "mating the C&E terrier with the IR retriever". For an interim period, officers of HMRC were empowered to use existing Inland Revenue powers in relation to matters within the remit of the old Inland Revenue (such as income tax, stamp duty and tax credits) and existing Customs powers in relation to matters within the remit of the old Customs & Excise (such as value added tax and excise duties). However, a major review of the powers required by HMRC was announced at the time of the 2004 pre-budget report on 9 December 2004, covering the suitability of existing powers, new powers that might be required, and consolidating the existing compliance regimes for surcharges, interest, penalties and appeal, which may lead to a single, consolidated enforcement regime for all UK taxes, and a consultation document was published after the 2005 budget on 24 March 2005. Legislation to introduce new information and inspection powers was included in the Finance Act 2008 (Schedule 36). The new consolidated penalty regime was introduced via the Finance Act 2007 (Schedule 24).

As part of the spending review on 12 July 2004, Gordon Brown estimated that 12,500 jobs would be lost as result of the merger by March 2008, around 14% of the combined headcount of Customs (then around 23,000) and Inland Revenue (then around 68,000). In addition, 2,500 staff would be redeployed to "front-line" activities. Estimates suggested this may save around £300 million in staff costs, out of a total annual budget of £4 billion.

Logo of HMRC until 2013

The total number of job losses included policy functions within the former Inland Revenue and Customs which moved into the Treasury, so that the Treasury became responsible for "strategy and tax policy development" and HMRC took responsibility for "policy maintenance". In addition, certain investigatory functions moved to the new Serious Organised Crime Agency, as well as prosecutions moving to the new Revenue and Customs Prosecution Office.

A further programme of job cuts and office closures was announced on 16 November 2006. Whilst some of the offices closed were in bigger cities where other offices already exist, many were in local, rural areas, where there is no other HMRC presence. Initial proposals indicated that up to 200 offices would close and a further 12,500 jobs lost from 2008 to 2011. In May 2009, staff morale in HMRC was the lowest of 11 government departments surveyed.

In 2013, HMRC began to introduce an update to the PAYE system, which meant it would receive information on tax and employee earnings from employers each month, rather than at the end of a tax year. A trial of the new system began in April 2012, and all employers switched by October 2013.

In 2012, Revenue Scotland was formed and on 1 April 2015 it took HMRC responsibility to collect devolved taxes in Scotland. In 2015 Welsh Revenue Authority was formed and on 1 April 2018 it took HMRC responsibility to collect devolved taxes in Wales.

On 12 November 2015, HMRC proposed to replace local offices with 13 regional centres by 2027.

In 2022, HMRC announced plans to dissolve Revenue and Customs Digital Technology Services (RCDTS) Ltd, an arms-length not-for-profit company that had provided certain IT services to HMRC. The company was set up and wholly owned by HMRC. It had roughly 750 employees. The majority of former RCDTS staff transferred to HMRC in the 2022/23 financial year.

HMRC has made a substantial investment of nearly £300 million to enhance its compliance and fraud investigation efforts. This funding has led to an increase in staffing within the Customer Compliance Group (CCG) and the Fraud Investigation Service (FIS). The CCG, responsible for enforcing tax compliance and addressing issues such as tax evasion, saw its workforce grow from 25,656 full-time equivalent staff (FTE) in November 2021 to a peak of 28,617 in October 2022, before stabilizing at 26,841 in October 2023. The FIS, which conducts both civil and criminal investigations into serious fraud cases, also experienced growth, increasing from 4,244 FTE in November 2021 to 4,956 by October 2022, although it slightly decreased to 4,735 by October 2023. The financial commitment to the FIS is reflected in rising pay costs, which increased from £267.1 million in the 2021-2022 fiscal year to £288.8 million in 2022-2023, with an estimated expenditure of £286.2 million projected for 2023-2024. This investment underscores HMRC's ongoing dedication to protecting public revenue and ensuring tax compliance across the UK.

Yves Laffont, Sector Lead for Financial Crime Consulting Services at FDM Group, has suggested that HMRC's efforts can serve as a model for businesses looking to strengthen their own fraud prevention teams. He emphasized the growing sophistication of fraudulent activities, including the use of artificial intelligence in scams. Laffont highlighted that fraud accounts for over 40% of recorded crimes in England but receives only 2% of police resources, which disproportionately affects vulnerable populations. He further pointed out that tier 2 financial institutions are becoming prime targets for sophisticated criminal enterprises, posing risks to their customers. To combat these challenges effectively, Laffont advocates for rapid skill acquisition and holistic team development within organizations. He stresses the importance of establishing a risk management mindset and fostering adaptability to change as key components of successful fraud prevention strategies.

== Notable cases ==
From August 2017 to April 2018, HMRC investigated an organised crime group based in Bolton that was involved in smuggling cigarettes into the United Kingdom, evading more than £41 million in tax and duty. In April 2026, eleven men were found guilty with five of them being sentenced to jail terms of up to three years and four months.

Between 2020 and at least 2026, HMRC participated in Operation Venetic, the United Kingdom's response to the infiltration of the EncroChat encrypted communications network by organised crime. Led by the National Crime Agency (NCA) and involving HMRC, regional organised crime units and police forces, the operation targeted organised crime groups engaged in drug trafficking, money laundering, tax and excise fraud, and large-scale smuggling. By 2023, the operation had resulted in more than 3,100 arrests and 1,240 convictions, with the seizure of over nine tonnes of Class A drugs, 173 firearms and millions of pounds in criminal assets, with prosecutions continuing in subsequent years.

In July 2026, HMRC announced that its largest ever fine for arms export control breaches. Airbus paid a fine of £6.4 million to UK revenue and ‌customs authorities to settle a two-year-old investigation into export control violations. The investigation focused on anomalies over the cross-border transfer of parts for the A400M military airlifter that came to light during an audit in 2022.

According to HMRC sources, the breaches included:

- Failing to keep accurate records of transfers of controlled technology as per the conditions of three of their open general export licences (OGELs)
- Failing to keep registers in relation to OGELs
- Failing to keep accurate records contrary to the conditions of one of their OGELs
- A failure of licence conditions on a standard individual export licence (SIEL)

== Governance structure ==
The board is composed of members of the executive committee and non-executive directors. Its main role is to develop and approve HMRC's overall strategy, approve final business plans and advise the chief executive on key appointments. It also performs an assurance role and advises on best practice.

The Treasury minister responsible for HMRC is Daniel Tomlinson.

=== Chairman ===
The chairman of HMRC was an executive role until 2008. Mike Clasper served as a non-executive chairman. From August 2012, the post was abolished with a 'lead non-executive director' chairing board meetings instead.

- Sir David Varney April 2005 – August 2006
- Paul Gray (acting) September 2006 – February 2007 and (confirmed) February 2007 – November 2007
- Dave Hartnett (acting) 2007 – 31 July 2008
- Mike Clasper 1 August 2008 – 1 August 2012

=== Chief executive ===
The chief executive is also the first permanent secretary for HMRC and the accounting officer.

- Dame Lesley Strathie 2008–2011
- Dame Lin Homer 2012–2016
- Sir Jon Thompson 2016–2019
- Sir Jim Harra 2019–2025
- John-Paul Marks 2025–present

Executive chair and permanent secretary

- Sir Edward Troup April 2016 – January 2018

=== Non-executive board members ===
Non-executive board members as of November 2019:

- Mervyn Walker (lead non-executive director)
- Michael Hearty
- Simon Ricketts
- Alice Maynard
- Juliette Scott
- Paul Morton
- Patricia Gallan

== Personnel ==
- Permanent secretary
- Director general
- Director
- Deputy director
- Grade 6
- Grade 7
- Senior officer
- Higher officer
- Officer
- Assistant officer
- Administrative assistant

See civil service grading schemes for details.

HMRC's Criminal Investigators and Mobile Enforcement Officers deployed within Fraud Investigation Service are uniformed officers. HMRC Officers have the same powers as police officers, but their equivalent police ranks are at a higher grade (see table below):

HM Revenue and Customs rank badges of uniformed officers
Grade	Higher Officer	Officer	Assistant officer
Police equivalent	Inspector & Chief inspector	Sergeant	Constable
Badge			

Officers of HMRC's Mobile Enforcement Teams in Great Britain wear black polo shirts, gold braid epaulettes and trousers, while officers in Northern Ireland wear either white or navy shirts with gold braid epaulettes and navy trousers. Should further protection be needed, HMRC enforcement officers have the option of wearing heavy-duty fluorescent sludge jackets.

== Performance ==
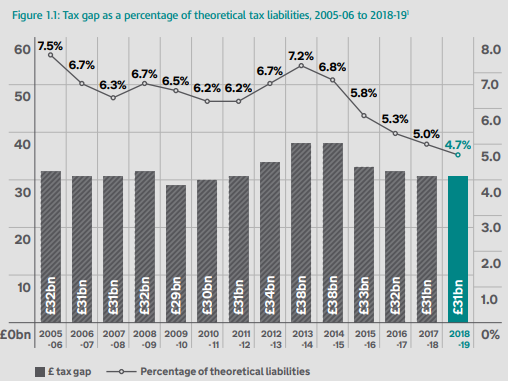
HMRC estimated tax gaps 2005/6-2018/19 (the difference between the amount of tax that should, in theory, be collected by HMRC, against what is actually collected)

HMRC collected £660 billion for the Treasury in 2018/19. It estimated that total theoretical tax liabilities in that year were £629 billion, but £31 billion was not collected due to the "tax gap", made up of money lost to tax evasion, tax avoidance, error and unpaid tax debts. This equates to a collection rate of 95.3% (up from 92.7% in 2005-6).

At the end of March 2009, HMRC was managing 20 million 'open' cases (where the department's systems identify discrepancies in taxpayer records or are unable to match a return to a record) which could affect around 4.5 million individuals who may have overpaid in total some £1.6 billion of tax and a further 1.5 million individuals who may have underpaid in total some £400 million of tax.

HMRC guidance notes that flexible arrangements can be made, where necessary, to assist individuals and businesses who have unpaid tax debts. Such "Time to Pay arrangements", for example an agreed monthly payment schedule, are based on the debtor's specific financial circumstances and the guidance notes that no "standard" Time to Pay arrangement exists. Interest is payable on a Time to Pay arrangement.

In 2007–08 HMRC overpaid tax credits to the value of £1 billion; at the end of March 2009, HMRC had £4.4 billion of overpayments to be recovered.

Organisationally, HMRC has successfully completed work to understand and reduce the environmental impact of its operations.

== Strengthened Whistleblower Reward Scheme ==
In November 2025, HMRC launched the Strengthened Reward Scheme, a whistleblower incentive programme modelled on the United States Internal Revenue Service (IRS) Whistleblower Program. Under the scheme, individuals who provide information leading to the collection of at least £1.5 million in unpaid tax may receive a reward of between 15% and 30% of the tax recovered, excluding penalties and interest. The programme targets serious non-compliance by large corporations, wealthy individuals, and those using offshore or tax avoidance schemes. Rewards are discretionary and not guaranteed, and anonymous informants are ineligible for payment. The scheme was announced as part of the government's strategy to address the UK's estimated £46.8 billion tax gap for the 2023/24 fiscal year.

== Controversies ==
=== Child benefit records misplacement ===
On 20 November 2007, the then Chancellor of the Exchequer, Alistair Darling, announced that two discs that held the personal details of all families in the United Kingdom claiming child benefit had gone missing. This is thought to affect approximately 25 million individuals and 7.5 million families in the UK. The missing discs include personal details such as name, date of birth, National Insurance number, and bank details.

Darling stated that there was no indication that the details had fallen into criminal hands; however, he urged people to monitor their bank accounts.

=== IT problems ===
EDS ran the Inland Revenue's tax and National Insurance system from 1994 to 2004. In 2003, the launch of a new tax credit system led to over-payments of £2 billion to over two million people. EDS later paid £71.25 million in compensation for the disaster. In 2004, the contract was awarded to Capgemini. This contract, also with Fujitsu and BT, was one of the biggest ever IT outsourcing contracts, at a value of £2.6 billion.

In February 2010, HMRC encountered problems following the implementation of their taxes modernisation program called Modernising Pay-as-you-Earn Processes for Customers (MPPC). The IT system was launched in June 2009 and its first real test came in a period known as annual coding. Annual coding issues certain codes to tax payers on a yearly basis. The annual coding process sent out incorrect tax coding notices to some taxpayers and their employers meaning that they would pay too much tax the following year.

=== Underpayments to ethnic-minority claimants ===
In August 2010, seven HMRC staff were sacked for deliberately underpaying benefits to ethnic-minority claimants. Dave Hartnett, permanent secretary for tax at HMRC, said the department operates a zero-tolerance policy on racial discrimination.

=== Goldman Sachs deal and surveillance of Osita Mba ===
The whistleblower Osita Mba revealed to The Guardian that HMRC entered a deal with Goldman Sachs which allowed Goldman Sachs to escape paying £10 million interest on unpaid tax. Following this HMRC used powers under the Regulation of Investigatory Powers Act (RIPA) "to examine the belongings, emails, internet search records and phone calls of their own solicitor, Osita Mba, and the phone records of his then wife" to find if he had spoken to the investigations editor of The Guardian, David Leigh.

MPs in the House of Commons public accounts committee praised Osita Mba and called for scrutiny into HMRC's use of RIPA powers in a report. The report said: "We are deeply disappointed by HMRC's handling of whistleblowers. We consider that HMRC's use of powers reserved for tackling serious criminals against Mr Osita Mba was indefensible. HMRC told us that it had changed how it deals with whistleblowers and that it now provides information to its audit and risk committee who can use this to challenge how HMRC handles whistleblowers."

=== Customer phone services ===
In September 2015, a report from Citizens Advice highlighted frustration amongst callers to HMRC over long holding times. The report claimed that "thousands" of callers were waiting on average 47 minutes to have their call answered, often at considerable expense to the caller. HMRC alleged that the "unscientific and out-of-date survey of tweets" did "not represent the real picture" but said that 3000 extra staff had been taken on to respond to calls. A June 2015 report from the National Audit Office indicated that the total number of calls answered by HMRC fell from 79% in 2013–14, to 72.5% in 2014–15; however, a subsequent report in May 2016 suggested that performance improved following the recruitment drive.

In January 2025, the House of Commons Public Accounts Committee published a report finding HMRC of deliberately degrading its telephone customer services to pressure taxpayers into using digital channels. The committee reported that average call waiting times reached 23 minutes during the 2023-24 tax year, an increase from 16 minutes in 2022-23, 12 minutes in 2021-22, and approximately 5 minutes in 2018-19. During the first 11 months of the 2023-24 fiscal year, HMRC disconnected 43,690 callers who had been waiting for more than 70 minutes to speak with an adviser which was a 535% increase compared to the 6,875 callers disconnected after equivalent wait times in 2022-23. HMRC also answered 66.4% of customer calls attempting to reach an adviser, falling short of its official target of 85%. HMRC Chief Executive Jim Harra rejected the PAC's conclusions as “completely baseless,” stating that HMRC had implemented significant operational improvements and reduced average call waiting times to approximately 11 minutes by early 2025.

=== European Commission on UK tax exemption ===
In November 2024, HM Revenue and Customs began refunding several major British companies, including firms listed on the London Stock Exchange and ITV, following a landmark ruling by the European Court of Justice (ECJ). This decision reversed a previous European Commission ruling from 2019 that classified a UK tax exemption as illegal state aid, requiring HMRC to collect additional taxes.

The tax exemption, applicable from 2013 to 2018, was designed to support British-based multinationals by exempting certain overseas financing activities from controlled foreign company (CFC) rules. These rules generally prevent companies from reducing tax liabilities by shifting profits to foreign subsidiaries. The exemption, initially introduced by former UK Chancellor George Osborne, aimed to make the UK a more attractive headquarters for large international corporations.

The European Commission initially contended that this exemption provided undue benefits to British companies, constituting illegal state aid, and required the UK to collect back taxes. However, the final appeal in 2024 sided with the UK, allowing HMRC to refund the affected companies and marking a significant moment in the legal landscape for UK tax and state aid policy.

== HMRC and fraud ==
HMRC reports a significant increase in charity tax fraud cases across civil and criminal courts. The organisation is actively working to improve systems that prevent fraudulent access to charitable tax reliefs, recognising growing vulnerabilities in the nonprofit sector. The rise in court cases highlights systemic challenges facing charitable organisations, particularly around financial management and compliance. Common issues include outdated financial records, incorrect documentation of authorised officials, and improper gift aid claim submissions. These administrative failures often lead to rejected tax returns and potential legal scrutiny. Despite these challenges, the charity sector remains predominantly compliant. HMRC is taking proactive steps to support organisations by developing more interactive guidance, utilising social media platforms, and creating clearer communication channels to help charities understand complex tax regulations. Trustees of charitable organizations are strongly advised to seek professional financial guidance, especially when dealing with complex monetary matters. The increased legal actions serve as a warning to maintain rigorous financial controls and ensure accurate record-keeping. The broader context suggests that while tax fraud in charities is a growing concern, HMRC's approach is focused on education and prevention rather than purely punitive measures. The goal is to strengthen the integrity of the charitable sector and protect legitimate nonprofit activities from potential financial misconduct.

== See also ==
- HM Revenue and Customs Museum
- Government Offices Great George Street
- Revenue Scotland
- Tŷ William Morgan - William Morgan House
- Welsh Revenue Authority
