= Parliamentary constituencies in Humberside =

List of Parliamentary constituencies in Humberside, Northern England

Humberside was abolished in 1996 both as a county council and a non-metropolitan county, being succeeded by the four unitary authorities of East Riding of Yorkshire, Kingston upon Hull, North Lincolnshire and North East Lincolnshire. The constituency boundaries used up to the 2005 United Kingdom general election were drawn up when the county still existed. For the review which came into effect for the 2010 general election, the four unitary authorities were considered together, and for the 2023 Periodic Review of Westminster constituencies, coming into effect for the 2024 United Kingdom general election, the Boundary Commission for England considered the area comprising the former county of Humberside with the county of South Yorkshire as a sub-region of Yorkshire and the Humber.

The area is divided into 10 parliamentary constituencies – 4 borough constituencies and 6 county constituencies, one of which includes parts of the Metropolitan Borough of Doncaster.

== Constituencies ==
† Conservative ‡ Labour ¤ Liberal Democrat # Reform UK

| Constituency | Electorate | Majority (Note: The majority is the number of votes the winning candidate receives more than their nearest rival.) | Member of Parliament | Nearest opposition | Map |
|---|---|---|---|---|---|
| Beverley and Holderness CC | 70,559 | 124 | Graham Stuart† | Margaret Pinder‡ | |
| Bridlington and The Wolds CC | 74,438 | 3,125 | Charlie Dewhirst† | Sarah Carter‡ | |
| Brigg and Immingham CC | 74,297 | 3,243 | Martin Vickers† | Najmul Hussain‡ | |
| Doncaster East and the Isle of Axholme CC (Part) | 70,133 | 2,311 | Lee Pitcher‡ | Nick Fletcher† | |
| Goole and Pocklington CC | 78,287 | 3,572 | David Davis† | Liam Draycott‡ | |
| Great Grimsby and Cleethorpes CC | 76,157 | 4,803 | Melanie Onn‡ | Oliver Freeston# | |
| Kingston upon Hull East BC (Note: Many sources list the Kingston upon Hull constituencies as Hull, following the city council's own practice. However, the official names have not adopted the short form.) | 70,560 | 3,920 | Karl Turner‡ | Neil Hunter# | |
| Kingston upon Hull North and Cottingham BC | 75,280 | 10,769 | Diana Johnson‡ | Martin Baker# | |
| Kingston upon Hull West and Haltemprice BC | 73,252 | 8,979 | Emma Hardy‡ | Julie Peck# | |
| Scunthorpe CC | 74,263 | 3,542 | Nic Dakin‡ | Holly Mumby-Croft† | |

== Boundary changes ==
=== 2024 ===
See 2023 Periodic Review of Westminster constituencies for further details.

| Former name | Boundaries 2010–2024 | Current name | Boundaries 2024–present |
|---|---|---|---|
| 1. Beverley and Holderness CC; 2. Brigg and Goole CC; 3. Cleethorpes CC; 4. East Yorkshire CC; 5. Great Grimsby BC; 6. Haltemprice and Howden CC; 7. Kingston upon Hull East BC; 8. Kingston upon Hull North BC; 9. Kingston upon Hull West and Hessle BC; 10. Scunthorpe CC | Boundaries 2010–2024 | 1. Beverley and Holderness CC; 2. Bridlington and The Wolds CC; 3. Brigg and Immingham CC; 4. Doncaster East and the Isle of Axholme CC (Part); 5. Goole and Pocklington CC; 6. Great Grimsby and Cleethorpes BC; 7. Kingston upon Hull East BC; 8. Kingston upon Hull North BC; 9. Kingston upon Hull West and Haltemprice BC; 10. Scunthorpe CC | Boundaries 2024–present |

For the 2023 Periodic Review of Westminster constituencies, which redrew the constituency map ahead of the 2024 United Kingdom general election, the Boundary Commission for England opted to combine the four unitary authorities which make up the former county of Humberside with South Yorkshire as a sub-region of the Yorkshire and the Humber Region, resulting in the creation of a new cross-county boundary constituency named Doncaster East and the Isle of Axholme, which encompassed part of the former Brigg and Goole constituency. Seven existing constituencies were abolished (Brigg and Goole, Cleethorpes, East Yorkshire, Great Grimsby, Haltemprice and Howden, Kingston upon Hull North and Kingston upon Hull West and Hessle) and replaced by six new seats wholly within the area (Bridlington and The Wolds, Brigg and Immingham, Goole and Pocklington, Great Grimsby and Cleethorpes, Kingston upon Hull North and Cottingham and Kingston upon Hull West and Haltemprice).

The following constituencies were created:

Containing electoral wards from East Riding of Yorkshire

- Beverley and Holderness
- Bridlington and The Wolds
- Goole and Pocklington
- Kingston upon Hull North and Cottingham (part)
- Kingston upon Hull West and Haltemprice (part)

Containing electoral wards from Kingston upon Hull

- Kingston upon Hull East
- Kingston upon Hull North and Cottingham (part)
- Kingston upon Hull West and Haltemprice (part)

Containing electoral wards from North East Lincolnshire

- Brigg and Immingham (part)
- Great Grimsby and Cleethorpes

Containing electoral wards from North Lincolnshire

- Brigg and Immingham (part)
- Doncaster East and the Isle of Axholme CC (part also in the South Yorkshire metropolitan borough of Doncaster)
- Scunthorpe CC

=== 2010 ===
Under the Fifth Periodic Review of Westminster constituencies, the Boundary Commission for England decided to retain the 10 constituencies covering the former county of Humberside for the 2010 election, making minor changes to realign constituency boundaries with the boundaries of current local government wards.

| Name | Boundaries 1997–2010 | Boundaries 2010–2024 |
|---|---|---|
| 1. Beverley and Holderness CC; 2. Brigg and Goole CC; 3. Cleethorpes CC; 4. East Yorkshire CC; 5. Great Grimsby BC; 6. Haltemprice and Howden CC; 7. Kingston upon Hull East BC; 8. Kingston upon Hull North BC; 9. Kingston upon Hull West and Hessle BC; 10. Scunthorpe CC | Parliamentary constituencies in Humberside | Proposed Revision |

== Results history ==
Primary data source: House of Commons research briefing – General election results from 1918 to 2019

=== 2024 ===
The number of votes cast for each political party who fielded candidates in constituencies comprising Humberside in the 2024 general election were as follows: (Note: Doncaster East and The Isle of Axholme is a cross-county constituency. As the results of UK general elections are not disclosed on a sub-constituency level, the constituency's vote shares have been omitted)

| Party | Votes | % | Change from 2019 | Seats | Change from 2019 |
|---|---|---|---|---|---|
| Labour | 135,391 | 37.4% | ▲8.0% | 6 | ▲3 |
| Conservative | 99,980 | 27.6% | ▼28.1% | 4 | ▼3 |
| Reform | 82,716 | 22.9% | ▲17.9% | 0 | 0 |
| Liberal Democrats | 22,406 | 6.2% | ▼0.1% | 0 | 0 |
| Greens | 15,676 | 4.3% | ▲1.8% | 0 | 0 |
| Others | 5,807 | 1.6% | ▲0.5% | 0 | 0 |
| Total | 361,976 | 100.0 | | 10 | |

=== Percentage votes ===
| Election year | 1983 | 1987 | 1992 | 1997 | 2001 | 2005 | 2010 | 2015 | 2017 | 2019 | 2024 |
|---|---|---|---|---|---|---|---|---|---|---|---|
| Labour | 29.2 | 34.8 | 40.3 | 50.4 | 46.7 | 41.0 | 30.8 | 33.9 | 42.1 | 29.4 | 37.4 |
| Conservative | 43.8 | 41.9 | 41.7 | 30.4 | 32.8 | 33.0 | 36.8 | 38.4 | 48.6 | 55.7 | 27.6 |
| Reform^{1} | – | – | – | – | – | – | – | – | – | 5.0 | 22.9 |
| Liberal Democrat^{2} | 26.8 | 23.1 | 17.4 | 15.8 | 17.1 | 20.8 | 22.5 | 5.4 | 3.7 | 6.3 | 6.2 |
| Green Party | – | * | * | * | * | * | 0.7 | 3.1 | 1.1 | 2.5 | 4.3 |
| UKIP | – | – | – | * | * | * | 4.5 | 18.0 | 3.2 | * | |
| Other | 0.2 | 0.2 | 0.6 | 3.3 | 3.4 | 5.2 | 4.7 | 1.2 | 1.3 | 1.1 | 1.6 |

^{1}As the Brexit Party in 2019 ^{2}1983 & 1987 – SDP–Liberal Alliance

* Included in Other

=== Seats ===
| Election year | 1983 | 1987 | 1992 | 1997 | 2001 | 2005 | 2010 | 2015 | 2017 | 2019 | 2024 |
|---|---|---|---|---|---|---|---|---|---|---|---|
| Labour | 4 | 5 | 5 | 7 | 7 | 7 | 5 | 5 | 5 | 3 | 6 |
| Conservative | 5 | 4 | 4 | 3 | 3 | 3 | 5 | 5 | 5 | 7 | 4 |
| Total | 9 | 9 | 9 | 10 | 10 | 10 | 10 | 10 | 10 | 10 | 10 |

^{1}1983 & 1987 – SDP–Liberal Alliance

=== Maps ===
==== 1885–1910 – East Riding of Yorkshire ====
1885

1886

1892

1895

1900

1906

Jan 1910

Dec 1910

==== 1918–1945 ====
1918

1922

1923

1924

1929

1931

1935

1945

==== 1950–1979 ====
1950

1951

1955

1959

1964

1966

1970

Feb 1974

Oct 1974

1979

==== 1983–2019 – Humberside ====
1983

1987

1992

1997

2001

2005

2010

2015

2017

2019

==== 2024–present – Humberside including a cross-county constituency partly in South Yorkshire ====
2024

== Historical representation by party ==
Data given here is for the East Riding of Yorkshire before 1983. A cell marked → (with a different colour background to the preceding cell) indicates that the previous MP continued to sit under a new party name.

=== 1885 to 1918 ===
Conservative Liberal

| Constituency | 1885 | 1886 | 1892 | 1895 | 1900 | 1906 | 07 | Jan 1910 | Dec 1910 | 11 | 15 |
|---|---|---|---|---|---|---|---|---|---|---|---|
| Buckrose | C. Sykes | | Holden | | White | | | | | | |
| Holderness | Bethell | | | | A. Wilson | | | | | | |
| Howdenshire | Duncombe | | Wilson-Todd | | | Harrison-Broadley | | | | | Jackson |
| Kingston upon Hull Central | King | | | | | | | | | M. Sykes | |
| Kingston upon Hull East | Saunders | Grotrian | Smith | Firbank | | Ferens | | | | | |
| Kingston upon Hull West | C. H. Wilson | | | | | C. H. W. Wilson | G. Wilson | | | | |

=== 1918 to 1950 ===
Coalition Liberal (1918–22) / National Liberal (1922–23) Conservative Labour Liberal

| Constituency | 1918 | 19 | 1922 | 1923 | 1924 | 26 | 1929 | 1931 | 1935 | 39 | 1945 | 47 |
|---|---|---|---|---|---|---|---|---|---|---|---|---|
| Buckrose | Moreing | | Gaunt | | | A. Braithwaite | | | | | Wadsworth | |
| Holderness | Wilson | | Bowdler | Savery | | | | | | G. Braithwaite | | |
| Howdenshire | Jackson | | | | | Carver | | | | | Glossop | Odey |
| Kingston upon Hull Central | Sykes | Kenworthy | | | | → | | Barton | Windsor | | Hewitson | |
| Kingston upon Hull East | Murchison | | Lumley | | | | Muff | Nation | Muff | | Pursey | |
| Kingston upon Hull North West | Ward | | | | | | | | | | Mackay | |
| Kingston upon Hull South West | Entwistle | | | | Grotrian | | Arnott | Law | | | Smith | |

=== 1950 to 1983 ===
Conservative Labour

| Constituency | 1950 | 1951 | 54 | 1955 | 1959 | 1964 | 66 | 1966 | 1970 | 71 | Feb 1974 | Oct 1974 | 1979 |
|---|---|---|---|---|---|---|---|---|---|---|---|---|---|
| Beverley / Howden (1955) | Odey | | | Bryan | | | | | | | | | |
| Bridlington | Wood | | | | | | | | | | | | Townend |
| Goole | Jeger | | | | | | | | | Marshall | | | |
| Haltemprice | Law | | Wall | | | | | | | | | | |
| Kingston upon Hull Central / K.u.H. West (1955) | Hewitson | | | | | Johnson | | | | | | | |
| Kingston upon Hull East | Pursey | | | | | | | | Prescott | | | | |
| Kingston upon Hull N / K.u.H. Central (1974) | Hudson | | | | Coulson | Solomons | McNamara | | | | | | |

=== 1983 to 2010 ===
Conservative Labour

| Constituency | 1983 | 1987 | 1992 | 1997 | 2001 | 2005 |
|---|---|---|---|---|---|---|
| Beverley / Beverley and Holderness (1997) | Wall | Cran | | | | Stuart |
| Boothferry / Haltemprice and Howden (1997) | Bryan | Davis | | | | |
| Bridlington / East Yorkshire (1997) | Townend | | | | Knight | |
| Brigg and Cleethorpes / Cleethorpes (1997) | Brown | | | McIsaac | | |
| Glanford and Scunthorpe / Scunthorpe (1997) | Hickmet | Morley | | | | |
| Great Grimsby | Mitchell | | | | | |
| Kingston upon Hull East | Prescott | | | | | |
| Kingston upon Hull North | McNamara | | | | | D. Johnson |
| Kingston upon Hull West / & Hessle (1997) | Randall | | | A. Johnson | | |
| Brigg and Goole | | | | Cawsey | | |

=== 2010 to present ===
Conservative Labour

| Constituency | 2010 | 2015 | 2017 | 2019 | 2024 |
|---|---|---|---|---|---|
| Beverley and Holderness | Stuart | | | | |
| Haltemprice and Howden / Goole & Pocklington (2024) | Davis | | | | |
| East Yorkshire / Bridlington & The Wolds (2024) | Knight | | | | Dewhirst |
| Cleethorpes / Brigg & Immingham (2024) | Vickers | | | | |
| Scunthorpe | Dakin | | | Mumby-Croft | Dakin |
| Great Grimsby / Great Grimsby & Cleethorpes (2024) | Mitchell | Onn | | Nici | Onn |
| Kingston upon Hull East | Turner | | | | |
| Kingston upon Hull North / K.u.H. North & Cottingham (2024) | D. Johnson | | | | |
| Kingston upon Hull West & Hessle / K.u.H. W & Haltemprice (2024) | A. Johnson | | Hardy | | |
| Brigg and Goole | Percy | | | | N/A |

== See also ==
- List of parliamentary constituencies in Yorkshire and the Humber
