= Firbank (surname) =

Firbank is a surname. Notable people with the surname include:

- Godfrey Firbank (1895–1947), English cricketer
- Joseph Firbank (1819–1886), British railway mechanical engineer
- Ronald Firbank (1886–1926), English novelist
- Thomas Firbank (1910–2000), Canadian memoirist
- Thomas Firbank (MP) (1850–1910), British politician
