= Heather Firbank =

English socialite

Heather Firbank (27 August 1888 – 13 April 1954) was an English socialite, now known for her fine collection of clothes kept at the Victoria and Albert Museum (V&A), London.

== Early life ==
Heather Firbank was born in England on 27 August 1888, at The Coopers, Chislehurst, Kent, the youngest of the four children of Sir Thomas and Lady Firbank, who was formerly Harriet Jane Garrett. She had three elder brothers, Joseph Sydney (1884–1904), Arthur Annesley Ronald (1886–1926), the novelist, and Hubert Somerset (1887–1913). Her father Sir Joseph Thomas Firbank (1850–1910) was a British Conservative politician, while her grandfather Joseph Firbank (1819–1886) built the family fortune as a railway contractor. Her older brother Ronald Firbank became famous after his death for his innovative novels. She was educated at home by a governess and was presented at Court on 15 May 1908.

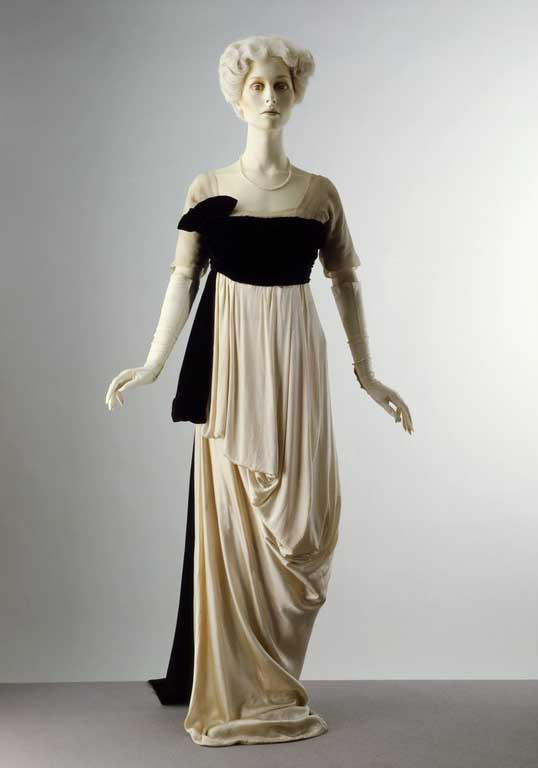
An evening dress worn by Heather Firbank in 1913, designed by Lucy Duff Gordon

== Clothes collection ==
Heather Firbank bought her clothes from highly regarded dressmakers and tailors in London, including Lucile, Mascotte, Redfern, Frederick Bosworth, Russell & Allen, Kate Reily, and the department store Woolland Brothers in Knightsbridge. The evening gown illustrated at right was designed by Lucile, one of the leading couturiers from the late 1890s to the early 1920s. The dress was named "El Dorado" and first appeared in Lucile's Spring 1913 collection. She often wore shades of heather and purple as a reflection of her name.

Two of Firbank's brothers died in their twenties, her father in 1910, and her mother in 1924. When her brother Ronald, the last member of her immediate family, died in 1926, she put most of her clothes into storage. She never married, and after her death in 1954 her wardrobe was inherited by her nephew, Lieutenant-Colonel Thomas Firbank (1910–2000).

== Legacy ==
The extensive collection then came to the attention of the Victoria and Albert Museum and was acquired in 1957, becoming the foundation for the museum's well-known collection of 20th century fashion. An exhibition of Firbank's clothes was held at the V&A in 1960 entitled A Lady of Fashion: Heather Firbank (1888-1954) and what she wore between 1908 and 1921. Other items from Heather Firbank's extraordinary wardrobe survive in the Museum of London, the Gallery of Costume in Manchester, Nottingham Museum, Leicester Museum, and Northampton Museum.

The V&A's Firbank collection is the subject of its publication entitled London Society Fashion 1905-1925: The Wardrobe of Heather Firbank, by Cassie Davies-Strodder, Jenny Lister and Lou Taylor.

Firbanks's clothes in the V&A were inspirational to the costume designs for Downton Abbey and to Cecil Beaton's designs for the costumes My Fair Lady (1964).

== Archive material ==
- Firbank, Heather, Letters to Ronald Firbank, Ronald Firbank Collection of papers, 1896–1952, The Berg Collection, (MSS Firbank), The New York Public Library, New York
- Firbank, Ronald, Letters to Heather Firbank, Fales Manuscript Collection ca.1700-2000, (MSS001), Fales Library, NEW York University, New York
- Heather Firbank archive, Archive of Art and Design, Victoria and Albert, Museum, London
