= 1895 Prime Minister's Resignation Honours =

British government recognitions

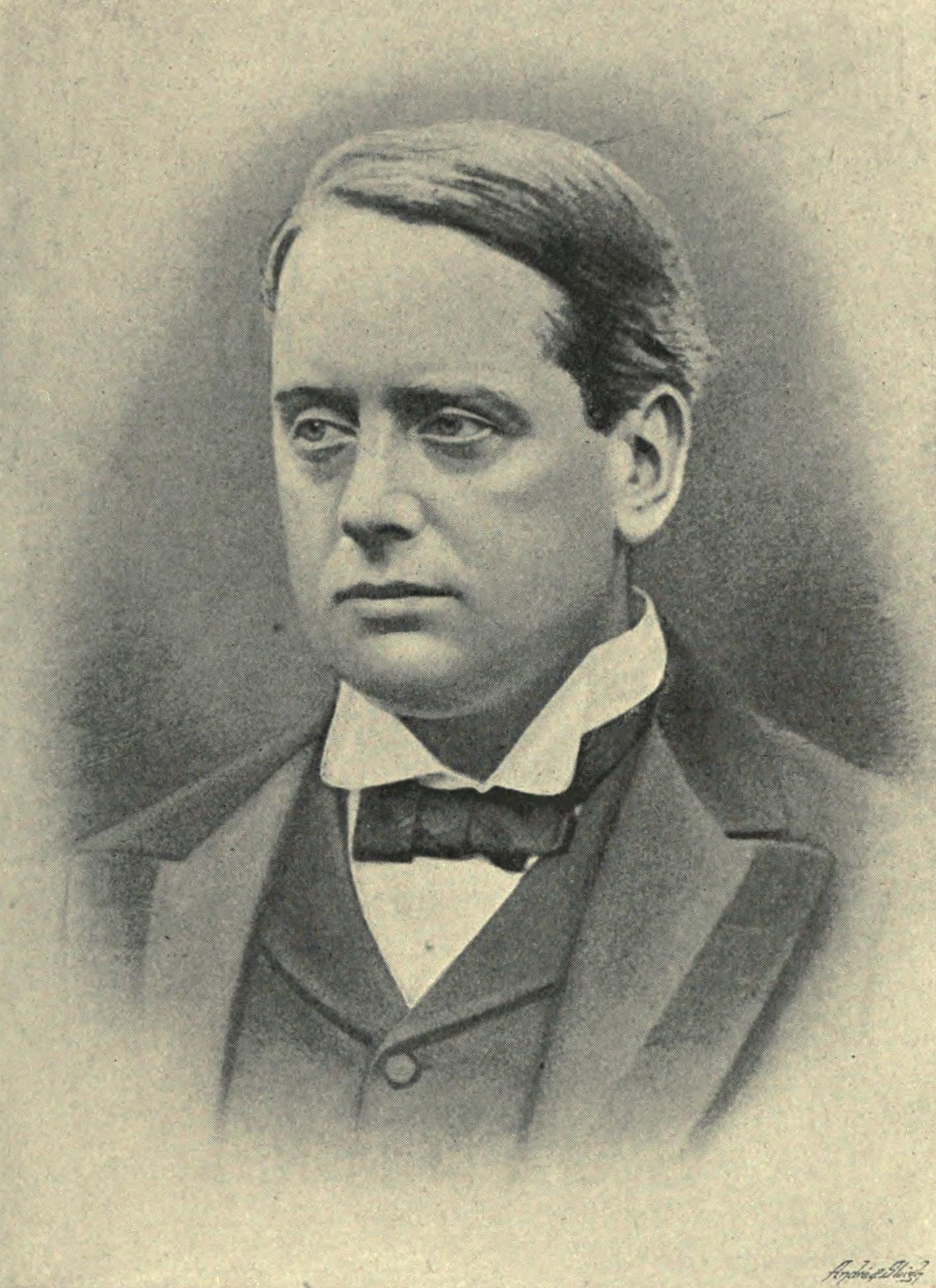
Lord Rosebery

The 1895 Prime Minister's Resignation Honours were announced in the British national press on 1 July 1895 following the resignation of Lord Rosebery's government on 22 June. The appointments to the Order of the Bath appeared officially in the London Gazette of 2 July.

== Earl ==
- Lord Houghton
- Lord Carrington

== Baron ==
- The Right Hon. Sir H. B. Loch, G.C.B.
- The Right Hon. Herbert Gardner, M.P.
- Mr Sydney Stern, M.P.
- Mr James Williamson, M.P.

== Baronet ==
- Mr James Blyth, a Governor of the Royal Agricultural Society.
- Mr William Agnew.
- Captain Naylor Leyland.
- Sir Joseph Renals, Lord Mayor of London.
- Mr James Bell, Lord Provost of Glasgow.

== Knight Bachelor ==
- Mr Arthur Arnold, Chairman of the London County Council.
- Colonel E. T. Gourley, M.P.
- Mr Clarence Smith, M.P. for Kingston upon Hull East
- Mr Frederick Howard.
- Dr H. D. Littlejohn.
- Mr Cowasjee Jehanghir.
- Mr James Low, Lord Provost of Dundee.

== Privy Counsellor ==
- Sir Ralph Thompson, K.C.B., late Under-Secretary of State for War.
- Sir Bernhard Samuelson, Bart., M.P.

== Order of the Star of India ==
=== Knight Grand Cross of the Order of the Star of India (GCSI) ===
- The Right Hon. Henry Hartley Fowler, M.P.

== The Most Honourable Order of the Bath ==
=== Knight Grand Cross of the Order of the Bath (GCB) ===
- The Right Hon. Henry Campbell-Bannerman.

=== Knight Commander of the Order of the Bath (KCB) ===
- Colonel Vivian Dering Majendie, C.B., Inspector of Explosives, Home Office.
- Robert Giffen, Esq., C.B., Comptroller-General of the Commercial, Labour, and Statistical Department, Board of Trade.
- Alfred Milner, Esq., C.B., Chairman of the Board of Inland Revenue.

=== Commander of the Order of the Bath (CB) ===
- William John Courthope, Esq., First Commissioner, Civil Service Commission.
- John Roche Dasent, Esq., Education Department.
- Maurice William Ernest de Bunsen, Esq., Chargé d'Affaires and Consul-General, Siam.
- Colonel Robert Bruce Fellows, retired, late 4th Battalion, Bedfordshire Regiment, Deputy Clerk of Council and Chief Clerk, Privy Council.
- Henry John Lowndes Graham, Esq., Clerk of the Parliaments.
- Arthur Henry Hardinge, Esq., Political Agent and Consul-General, Zanzibar.
- Charles Hardinge, Esq., commonly called the Honourable Charles Hardinge, a Second Secretary in the Diplomatic Service.
- Edward Stanley Hope, Esq., one of the Charity Commissioners.
- Francis John Stephens Hopwood, Esq., C.M.G., one of the Assistant Secretaries, Board of Trade.
- John Wesley Judd, Esq., Professor of Geology, Royal College of Science.
- Edward Chandos Leigh, Esq., Q.C., commonly called the Honourable Edward Chandos Leigh, Q.C., Counsel to the Speaker.
- Captain Frederick John Dealtry Lugard, D.S.O., Norfolk Regiment.
- Reginald MacLeod, Esq., the Queen's and Lord Treasurer's Remembrancer, Scotland.
- Alfred Richard Pennefather, Esq., Receiver for the Metropolitan Police District, and for the Police Courts of the *Metropolis.
- Alfred de Bock Porter, Esq., Secretary to the Ecclesiastical Commissioners.
- Stephen Edward Spring-Rice, Esq., one of the Principal Clerks in the Treasury.
- Armine Wodehouse, Esq., commonly called the Honourable Armine Wodehouse, Private Secretary to the late Secretary of State for Foreign Affairs.
