= Thomas Ferens =

British Politician, Industrialist, Philanthropist

The Right Honourable Thomas Robinson Ferens
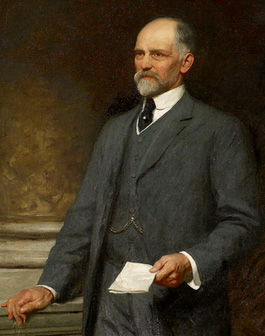
- Thomas Robinson Ferens by Frank Dicksee

Member of Parliament for Kingston upon Hull East
- In office 8 February 1906 – 25 November 1918
- Preceded by: Thomas Firbank
- Succeeded by: Charles Murchison

Personal details
- Born: 4 May 1847 East Thickley, County Durham
- Died: 9 May 1930 (aged 83) Kingston upon Hull, East Riding of Yorkshire
- Party: Liberal
- Spouse: Esther Ellen (Ettie) Field

Thomas Robinson Ferens (4 May 1847 – 9 May 1930) was a British Liberal Party politician, a philanthropist, and an industrialist. He was the Member of Parliament for Kingston upon Hull East for 13 years, and served the city as a Justice of the Peace and as High Steward. He helped establish Reckitt and Sons, a manufacturer of household goods, as one of Kingston upon Hull's foremost businesses. His career with the company spanned 61 years—from his initial employment as a confidential and shorthand clerk until his death, as chairman, in 1930.

In the House of Commons, Ferens spoke to further the cause of Women's Rights. He supported women's suffrage at home, and repeatedly drew attention to the trafficking of women and girls in the colonies but, never a great orator, and by nature a retiring man, much of his work at Westminster was completed in the committee rooms, away from the limelight. He did not seek re-election after being unseated in an acrimonious campaign in 1918.

A devout Wesleyan Methodist, Ferens made numerous charitable donations throughout his life. His gifts to Hull include the Ferens Art Gallery and a donation of £250,000 for the establishment of University College (now the University of Hull). He is memorialized in the university's motto: Lampada Ferens ('Bearing the torch'). In other parts of the country he made substantial donations to schools, hospitals and charitable organisations.

== Early life ==
=== Childhood and early career ===
Ferens was born on 4 May 1847 in East Thickley, a village close to the market town of Bishop Auckland, County Durham. His place of birth has also been recorded as Shildon. He was the third of the seven children of George Waller Ferens (1817–1893), a flour miller, and his wife, Anne, née Jackson. After attending Bishop Auckland private school until the age of 13, he found employment as a clerk in the Shildon office of the mineral department of the Stockton and Darlington Railway. Six years later, he left home for Stockton-on-Tees, where he worked as a clerk to Head Wrightson & Co.

A committed autodidact, he taught himself grammar, arithmetic, mechanics, and shorthand. At weekends he taught at Sunday school and enjoyed playing cricket. In 1868, after working in Stockton for two years, he left to take up a post as a confidential shorthand clerk to James Reckitt of Reckitt and Sons in Kingston upon Hull.

=== Family life ===
In Hull, Ferens continued to teach in Sunday School, a practice he began during his time in Stockton. While teaching at the Brunswick Sunday School he met Ester Ellen (Ettie) Field, a fellow teacher and a wealthy merchant's daughter of "rather masculine appearance." They married in 1873 at Sculcoates Registry Office; and they continued to teach at the Sunday School for the rest of their lives. Though Ettie remained childless, the couple adopted her nephew, John Johnson Till (known as Till), in 1880. Till Ferens separated from his wife and became estranged from his adoptive parents during the 1914–18 war. Till Ferens, like Thomas, was a Liberal and stood for the Liberal Party at Gainsborough in the 1935 general election.

== A career in industry ==
Reckitt and Sons was already a successful firm when Ferens joined it in 1868. It produced household wares such as starch, washing blue and black lead. It had been acquired by Isaac Reckitt, a Quaker, in 1840 and was now run by his sons, also Quakers, George (1825–1900), Francis (1827–1917) and James (1833–1924).

Ferens was industrious and forward-thinking; he moved swiftly through the company's managerial ranks. In 1874 he became works manager with a share in profits; in 1879, secretary; in 1880, general manager. He joined the board of directors in 1888 when Reckitt and Sons became a private joint-stock company. When James Reckitt died, 36 years later, Ferens was named joint chairman.

Under the guidance of Ferens and James Reckitt, the company flourished, becoming one of the most successful in the city. It opened offices in London and New York and expanded into pharmaceuticals – a natural progression from its disinfectants business. Such that a commonphrase is used to describe Ferens, "'Reckitt's Blue made Ferens' gold".

The disinfectant Dettol was launched in 1932.

== Politics and public life ==
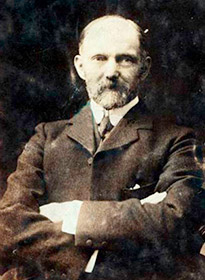
Thomas Ferens in 1906, the year he was elected to parliament

In 1894 Ferens was appointed a Justice of the Peace. In 1911 he was made a Freeman of the City of Hull. He entered parliament as Liberal member for Kingston upon Hull East in 1906 after an unsuccessful bid for the same seat six years earlier. In 1912 King George V appointed him to the Privy Council, and in the same year he became High Steward of Hull.

He was not a frequent speaker in parliament but he chaired several committees and was a member of the Inter-Parliamentary Union before the First World War. Hansard, the printed record of parliamentary debates, records that his first parliamentary contribution related to schools in orphan homes, and his last to the health of troops in Palestine.

A recurrent theme in Ferens' parliamentary contributions is Women's Rights. In 1910 he presented a petition in favour of the enfranchisement of women. In 1912, when the House discussed an allegedly inflammatory speech by Emmeline Pankhurst, Ferens wondered whether her speech might have been influenced by the "example of some Privy counsellors." The following year, he asked several questions regarding slave-trading in women; including the trade in West African women, and the trade of European and Japanese women to India. In 1917 he questioned the Home Secretary on the role of women in the police force.

Ferens' personal and religious convictions are evident in other of his parliamentary contributions. He tabled a number of questions concerning temperance, both at home and in the colonies. His first question in the Commons was about orphan schools. He later asked about railway accidents to children, and about trafficking of young girls in India.

In 1915 Ferens opened a parliamentary debate on the increase in the cost of living caused by the war, which was "causing much hardship, especially to the poor." He noted that "Many labourers' families have now to be content, owing to the high price of the necessaries of life, with one meal of meat in the week." In replying, the prime minister, H. H. Asquith, agreed that prices were high but he felt they were not as high as might have been expected considering the scale of the global conflict. He remarked that the current high prices were not without precedent, even in peacetime; the price of coal was no higher than it had been in 1875.

Ferens also intervened on behalf of his constituency and its inhabitants. In April 1913 he drew the attention of the Postmaster-General to the case of a post office sorting-clerk who was having difficulties claiming his pension. On 10 August 1916, after a fatal raid by a Zeppelin in early on the previous morning, against which the city had been able to muster only a single searchlight and one gun, he asked that adequate defences be provided and brought to action where necessary.

The 1918 election campaign was acrimonious and Ferens was subjected to personal attacks accusing him of being a Little Englander. In reporting on the four contested Hull seats, The Times spoke of "Slashing attacks, covert insults, challenges, defiances and the incessant chatter of other weapons... ." It noted that Ferens' opponent, Charles Murchinson, was "busy digging out 'Little Navy’ speeches of Mr Ferens in 1909 [cf. 'Little Englander'] ... ." Murchinson was elected and Ferens resolved never to stand again. After the war he became an active supporter of the League of Nations. Away from politics, Ferens was an important figure in the nonconformist community although, typically, he stayed out of the limelight. In a survey of the personalities of Free Church leaders, the Times noted that "among the most respected counsellors of Nonconformity are men who seldom figure on platforms", and went on to list Ferens among their number. "The leadership of Nonconformity is largely in the hands of laymen", it commented.

In 1924 Ferens attempted to intervene on behalf William George Smith, a ship's painter who had been sentenced to death for murder at York Assizes. A telegram addressed to the King was sent in the early hours of 9 December appealing for the exercise of the Royal Prerogative of Mercy but the appeal was unsuccessful and Smith was executed at Hull Gaol later that morning.

== Temperance ==
Ferens was a lifelong teetotaller and a strong advocate of temperance. In his youth he attended Band of Hope meetings. In 1913 he was elected treasurer of the United Kingdom Alliance.

In 1923 he shared a platform with the Archbishop of Canterbury at the Mansion House. The occasion was the inaugural meeting of the National United Campaign of the Churches, which was organised by The Temperance Council of the Christian Churches of England and Wales.

The campaign's objectives were to present "the modern scientific indictment of alcoholic beverages and its moral implications", and to "rally local support for the Council’s immediate legislative program", which included the prohibition of the sale of alcohol to persons under the age of 18, and the banning of the sale of alcohol on Sundays. However, the Campaign was firmly opposed to prohibition, as is plain in The Times' report of the Archbishop's address: "To his mind prohibition was the very antithesis of temperance (Cheers.) It was an open confession of failure." Ferens donated £1,000 to a fund established to accomplish the aims of the campaign.

== Philanthropy ==
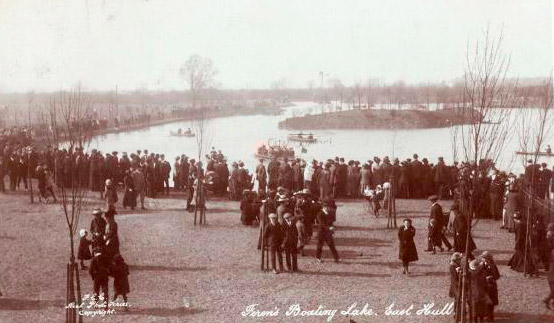
The Ferens Boating Lake, East Park, Hull in 1914, two years after Ferens donated the land to the city 53.7666°N 0.3007°W

From the time he started earning a salary, Ferens allocated 10% of his income to charity. His personal wealth increased quickly, in line with the growth of Reckitt and Sons, affording him the opportunity to make ever more generous donations. This he deemed "one of the greatest blessings of my life." By 1920 he was distributing £47,000 out of his annual income of £50,000.

In 1917 Ferens purchased a plot of land in Queen Victoria Square in Hull city centre. The land was the site of a former church, Saint John's. Later in the year he wrote to the council, informing them that he intended to donate the land to the city, and that he would also donate shares in Reckitt and Sons worth £35,000. In his letter, which was read out at a council meeting, Ferens explained that the shares and the land were to be used to build an art gallery. Nine years later the Prince of Wales laid the foundation stone for the Ferens Art Gallery. Afterwards, the Prince visited the premises of Reckitt and Sons where he was greeted by the company's workforce which now numbered 6000. The Ferens Art Gallery finally opened in 1927.

Educational establishments and hospitals were often the beneficiaries of Ferens’ munificence. In 1924 he donated £30,000 to extend Kingswood School for Boys, Bath. A year later, the Queen opened an extension to Farringtons Girls School, Chislehurst, Kent, which Ferens had made possible with a donation of a similar amount. In the same year a new post-graduate Theological College, to which he had donated £17,000, was opened in Cambridge for the training of Wesleyan ministers.

In February 1927 Ferens formally handed over the Ferens Institute of Otolaryngology to Prince Arthur, which he had made possible by a donation of £20,000. In handing over the institute, Ferens said that he hoped that it would attract workers from all parts of the Empire, and from countries outside it.

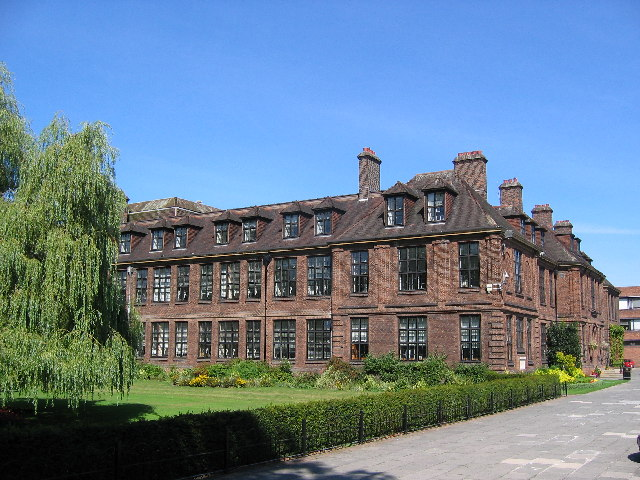
Ferens donated £250,000 for the establishment of University College, now the University of Hull. 53.769819°N 0.368599°W

In 1925 Ferens made his largest single donation. He wrote to the lord mayor of Kingston upon Hull to inform him that he intended to donate £250,000 towards the foundation of a university college in the city. The college would be built in the west of city on an eighteen and a half acre site, which Ferens had previously donated. The Duke of York laid the foundation stone in 1928, and Prince George opened the new college in 1929. Ferens became the college's first president, and is memorialized its motto: "Lampada Ferens"—"carrying the light (of learning)". The dove in the university's logo, which signifies peace, is taken from Ferens' coat of arms.

Ferens remained a modest man; he saw giving as a moral duty and repeatedly declined offers of ennoblement. In replying to the headmaster's speech when he visited Kingswood school in 1926, the King said:

The headmaster is right in assuming that I am already well acquainted with Mr Ferens’s benefactions in other parts of the country; this is not the first time I have been associated with him in this manner, and though I know the last thing that he would want would be a public expression of thanks on my part, I would like to be allowed to share in the debt of gratitude which the Kingswood School owes him today.

== Legacy ==
In March 1930, ill health prevented Ferens from attending the company's Annual Meeting. It was the first he had missed in 50 years. He had not fulfilled any public engagements for some weeks; nevertheless, he wrote out his speech and it was presented by Sir Harold Reckitt. In the speech Ferens was again able to present the board with pleasing figures. The net profit was £1,277,683, an increase of £33,108 over 1928, which was itself a record year. It was a source of great gratification for him "to be able to say that the most cordial relations exist between the workers, the management and the board". Ferens died in his home, Holderness House, in East Hull on 9 May 1930. Hettie had predeceased him eight years earlier. In his will he bequeathed the house and its grounds, together with an endowment of £50,000, to be used as a rest home for poor gentlewomen and to be preserved as an open space for East Hull. As of 2011, the house continues to be run as a residential home for ladies.

The year after his death, a pageant was held to mark the opening of Ferensway, a major new thoroughfare in the centre of the city. The Times reported that it would "rank as one of the finest in the North of England", and continued, "The street is 100 ft wide, 10 ft wider than Regent Street in London." To make way for the new street, a large slum area was cleared of houses. Low-rent housing was provided to those displaced by the new road.

Reckitt and Son merged with J&J Colman in 1938 becoming Reckitt & Colman Ltd. In 1999 that company merged with Benckiser N.V. to become Reckitt Benckiser. In 2006 Reckitt Benckiser acquired Boots Healthcare International for £1.9 billion. Though the company is now headquartered in Slough, the Hull site remains one of the city's most significant employers.

In the 21st century, Thomas Ferens' legacy remains woven into fabric of the city of Hull. University college continued to expand, gaining its Royal Charter in 1954. In 1979 it became the first university to be awarded the Queen's Award for Technological Achievement.

Alumni include the politicians John Prescott, Frank Field and Roy Hattersley, and the poet Roger McGough. Ferens Art Gallery now houses an internationally renowned permanent collection which includes works by Antonio Canaletto, David Hockney, Stanley Spencer and Henry Moore. Generations of Hull's children have enjoyed summers on the boating lake and drenching, perilous trips aboard its Wicksteed Splashboat. Almshouses which Ferens donated to the city in 1910 still provide shelter to the city's needy almost a century after his death. In 2012 a new secondary school named Thomas Ferens Academy opened in Hull which was named in his honour (the school was renamed Sirius Academy North in 2015).

== Bibliography ==
- Allison, K. J. (1969), "Social institutions: Art Gallery", A History of the County of York East Riding, vol. 1: The City of Kingston upon Hull (online ed.), British History Online, ISBN 0-19-722737-6
- Audit Commission (2003), Pickering and Ferens Homes Almshouses - Inspection report, The Audit Commission, archived from the original (PDF) on 17 April 2009
- Church, Roy; Harrison, B. (2004). "Reckitt, Sir James, first baronet (1833–1924).". In Matthew, H. C. G.; Harrison, Brian (eds.). Oxford Dictionary of National Biography. Oxford Dictionary of National Biography (online ed.). Oxford University Press. doi:10.1093/ref:odnb/51485. ISBN 978-0-19-861411-1. (Subscription, Wikipedia Library access or UK public library membership required.)
- "Ferens, Rt Hon. Thomas Robinson", Who Was Who, A & C Black (online ed.), Oxford University Press, December 2007 [1920–2008]
- Fowler, Mary (2002), The Story of East Park, Hull, Highgate Publications (Beverley), ISBN 1-902645-27-8
- Gillet, Edward; MacMahon, Kenneth A. (1989) [1980], A History of Hull (Second and Extended ed.), Oxford University Press, ISBN 0-85958-481-X
- Hesleton, Philip (2009), "Thomas R. Ferens", A Guide to the City's Heritage Plaques (PDF), Waterfront Communities Project, archived from the original (PDF) on 19 April 2013
- Hull, University of (2007), Annual Report 2006/07 (PDF), University of Hull, archived from the original (PDF) on 8 October 2011
- Pearson, Robin; Harrison, B. (2004). "Ferens, Thomas Robinson (1847–1930)". In Matthew, H. C. G.; Harrison, Brian (eds.). Oxford Dictionary of National Biography. Oxford Dictionary of National Biography (online ed.). Oxford University Press. doi:10.1093/ref:odnb/46992. ISBN 978-0-19-861411-1. (Subscription, Wikipedia Library access or UK public library membership required.)

Parliament of the United Kingdom
Preceded by Joseph Firbank	Member of Parliament for Kingston upon Hull East; 1906–1918	Succeeded by Charles Murchison
