= Clarence Smith (politician) =

English politician

Sir Clarence Smith

Member of Parliament for Kingston upon Hull East
- In office 4 July 1892 – 13 July 1895
- Preceded by: Frederick Brent Grotrian
- Succeeded by: Thomas Firbank

Personal details
- Born: 1849
- Died: 10 June 1941 (aged 91–92)
- Party: Liberal

Clarence Smith (16 June 1849 – 10 June 1941) was a British Liberal politician who served as Member of Parliament for Kingston upon Hull East in the 25th Parliament between 1892 and 1895.

He was born in Wakefield, Yorkshire, the son of Gervase Smith (1821–1882), Wesleyan Methodist minister (and president of the W.M. Conference in 1875). He attended Woodhouse Grove School from 1862 to 1864.

He was elected a member of the London Stock Exchange in 1874. In 1875 he married Mary, daughter of William Thomas Webster (1814–1899) of Highbury Hill, at the Highbury Wesleyan Chapel.

Smith unsuccessfully contested the West Division of Cambridgeshire in the 1886 general election. He was first elected to the House of Commons at the 1892 general election. He unsuccessfully contested North Bristol at the 1900 general election.

He was knighted in the 1895 Resignation Honours.

The 1912 Stock Exchange Yearbook recorded him as chairman of the Star Life Assurance Society.
