= George Muff, 1st Baron Calverley =

Calverley in 1947

George Muff, 1st Baron Calverley (10 February 1877 – 20 September 1955) was a British Liberal then Labour politician.

== Childhood ==
Muff was the son of George Muff, a miner of Bradford, Yorkshire, and his wife Sarah Jane (née Hodgson), and initially worked as a textile worker.

Speaking in 1948, Muff described how as a child he narrowly avoided being sent to the workhouse and shipped off to Australia as a result of his family's poverty. In the event, for part of his childhood Muff was raised by his neighbours.

== Political career ==
At the 1918 General election he stood as Liberal Party candidate for Bradford South, finishing third. He left the Liberals and joined the Labour Party. In 1921 and 1922 he was an unsuccessful Labour candidate in the Bradford Borough Council elections. In 1926 he was elected to Bradford Council, representing Manningham ward. In 1929 he was elected to the House of Commons for Kingston upon Hull East, a seat he held until 1931 and again from 1935 to 1945. He was also a Deputy Lieutenant of the West Riding of Yorkshire and a Justice of the Peace for the area. On 17 November 1945 he was raised to the peerage as Baron Calverley, of the City of Bradford in the West Riding of the County of York.

== Family ==
Lord Calverley married Ellen Eliza, daughter of Charles William Orford, in 1909. He died in September 1955, aged 78, and was succeeded in the barony by his son George. Lady Calverley died in 1965.

== Arms ==
Coat of arms of George Muff, 1st Baron Calverley
Crest In front of two miners' picks in saltire a miner’s safety lamp all Proper. Escutcheon Azure within two barrulets wavy Argent between in chief a rose of the second barbed and seeded Proper and in base a fleece Or three ducal coronets of the last. Supporters On either side a calf Proper. Motto Labor Omnia Vincit

Parliament of the United Kingdom
Preceded by Lawrence Roger Lumley	Member of Parliament for Kingston upon Hull East; 1929 – 1931	Succeeded by John Nation
Preceded by John Nation	Member of Parliament for Kingston upon Hull East; 1935 – 1945	Succeeded by Harry Pursey
Peerage of the United Kingdom
New creation	Baron Calverley; 1945 – 1955	Succeeded by George Raymond Orford Muff
