= Kingston upon Hull East =

Parliamentary constituency in the United Kingdom, 1885 onwards

Coordinates: 53.767°N 0.287°W

- Borough constituency for the House of Commons
- Interactive map of boundaries since 2024
- Boundary within Yorkshire and the Humber
- County: East Riding of Yorkshire
- Electorate: 65,116 (December 2019)

Current constituency
- Created: 1885
- Member of Parliament: Karl Turner (Labour)
- Seats: One
- Created from: Kingston upon Hull

Kingston upon Hull East is a borough constituency for the House of Commons of the Parliament of the United Kingdom. It elects one Member of Parliament (MP) at least once every five years by the first-past-the-post electoral system. Karl Turner has represented the constituency since 2010 as a Labour Party MP, but sat as an independent politician after his party whip was withdrawn in March 2026 until it was restored in October 2026.

== Constituency profile ==
The Kingston upon Hull East constituency is located in the East Riding of Yorkshire and covers the eastern parts of the city of Kingston upon Hull, more commonly known as Hull. This includes the neighbourhoods of Victoria Dock, Southcoates, Summergangs, Marfleet, Stoneferry, Sutton-on-Hull and parts of Bransholme. Kingston-upon-Hull is an industrial city based at the confluence of the River Hull and the Humber estuary and has been an important port city for around 800 years. The city has been described as an "up and coming" place to live. This constituency has high levels of deprivation and is the least wealthy of the city's three constituencies. Bransholme and Marfleet contain mostly social housing and fall within the top 10% most-deprived areas in England, whilst Sutton Ings and the Garden Village are generally affluent, middle-class suburbs. House prices in the constituency are lower than the rest of Yorkshire and the average house price is less than half the national average.

In general, residents of the constituency have very low levels of education, household income and homeownership. Few work in professional occupations and a very high proportion work in manufacturing. White people made up 96% of the population at the 2021 census. At the city council, the wealthier areas closer to the city centre are represented by Liberal Democrats whilst the more deprived areas in the east and north elected Labour Party councillors. Voters in the constituency overwhelmingly supported leaving the European Union in the 2016 referendum; an estimated 72% voted in favour of Brexit compared to the nationwide figure of 52%, with Electoral Calculus ranking the constituency as the seventh-highest Leave vote out of 650 constituencies across the country.

== History ==
In the early years of the constituency, it continually changed hands between the Conservative Party and the then-Liberal Party. Kingston upon Hull East has returned Labour MPs since 1935, and from 1945 to 2010 was represented by only two members, former seamen, Harry Pursey and John Prescott (who became Deputy Prime Minister, at the time in charge of town and country planning policy).

== Boundaries ==
Map of boundaries 2010–2024

1885–1918: The Municipal Borough of Hull wards of Alexandra, Beverley, Drypool, Sutton, and part of Central.

1918–1950: The County Borough of Hull wards of Alexandra, Drypool, and Southcoates.

1950–1955: The County Borough of Hull wards of Alexandra, Drypool, Marfleet, Southcoates, Stoneferry, and Sutton.

1955–1974: The County Borough of Hull wards of Alexandra, Drypool, East Central, Marfleet, Myton, Southcoates, Stoneferry, and Sutton.

1974–1983: The County Borough of Hull wards of Bransholme, Drypool, Greatfield, Holderness, Longhill, Marfleet, Stoneferry, and Sutton.

1983–2010: The City of Kingston upon Hull wards of Drypool, Holderness, Ings, Longhill, Marfleet, Southcoates, and Sutton.

2010–2024: The City of Kingston upon Hull wards of Drypool, Holderness, Ings, Longhill, Marfleet, Southcoates East, Southcoates West, and Sutton.

2024–present: The City of Kingston upon Hull wards of Drypool, Holderness, Ings, Longhill & Bilton Grange, Marfleet, North Carr, Southcoates, and Sutton.

Seat expanded to bring its electorate within the permitted range by adding the North Carr ward from Kingston upon Hull North.

== Members of Parliament ==
Kingston upon Hull prior to 1885

Election	Member	Party
1885	William Saunders	Liberal
1886	Frederick Brent Grotrian	Conservative
1892	Clarence Smith	Liberal
1895	Thomas Firbank	Conservative
1906	Thomas Ferens	Liberal
1918	Charles Murchison	Conservative
1922	Roger Lumley	Conservative
1929	George Muff	Labour
1931	John Nation	Conservative
1935	George Muff	Labour
1945	Harry Pursey	Labour
1970	John Prescott	Labour
2010	Karl Turner	Labour
2026	Karl Turner	Independent
2026	Karl Turner	Labour

== Elections ==
=== Elections in the 2020s ===
2024 general election: Kingston upon Hull East
Party	Candidate	Votes	%	±%
Labour	Karl Turner	13,047	43.8	+2.2
Reform	Neil Hunter	9,127	30.6	+13.8
Liberal Democrats	Bob Morgan	3,252	10.9	+5.9
Conservative	Kieran Persand	2,715	9.1	−25.2
Green	Julia Brown	1,675	5.6	+3.3
Majority		3,920	13.2	+5.9
Turnout		29,816	42.2	−4.6
Registered electors		70,650		
Labour hold		Swing	−5.8	

=== Elections in the 2010s ===
2019 notional result
Party	Vote	%
Labour	14,134	41.6
Conservative	11,639	34.3
Brexit Party	5,710	16.8
Liberal Democrats	1,685	5.0
Green	785	2.3
Turnout	33,953	46.8
Electorate	72,622	

2019 general election: Kingston upon Hull East
Party	Candidate	Votes	%	±%
Labour	Karl Turner	12,713	39.2	−19.1
Conservative	Rachel Storer	11,474	35.4	+5.5
Brexit Party	Marten Hall	5,764	17.8	New
Liberal Democrats	Bob Morgan	1,707	5.3	+1.9
Green	Julia Brown	784	2.4	+1.1
Majority		1,239	3.8	−24.6
Turnout		32,442	49.3	−6.2
Registered electors		65,745		
Labour hold		Swing	−12.3	

The turnout of 49.3% in Kingston upon Hull East was the lowest in any constituency in the United Kingdom at the 2019 general election, and was the only instance of a seat where fewer than half of the eligible electorate voted. It was also the seat with the lowest number of votes for a winning candidate in England.

2017 general election: Kingston upon Hull East
Party	Candidate	Votes	%	±%
Labour	Karl Turner	21,355	58.3	+6.6
Conservative	Simon Burton	10,959	29.9	+14.0
UKIP	Mark Fox	2,573	7.0	−15.4
Liberal Democrats	Andrew Marchington	1,258	3.4	−3.1
Green	Julia Brown	493	1.3	−1.0
Majority		10,396	28.4	−0.9
Turnout		36,638	55.5	+2.0
Registered electors		65,959		
Labour hold		Swing		

2015 general election: Kingston upon Hull East
Party	Candidate	Votes	%	±%
Labour	Karl Turner	18,180	51.7	+3.8
UKIP	Richard Barrett	7,861	22.4	+14.4
Conservative	Christine Mackay	5,593	15.9	−0.7
Liberal Democrats	David Nolan	2,294	6.5	−16.3
Green	Sarah Walpole	806	2.3	New
Yorkshire First	Martin Clayton	270	0.8	New
National Front	Mike Cooper	86	0.2	−2.4
SDP	Val Hoodless	54	0.2	New
Majority		10,319	29.3	+4.2
Turnout		35,144	53.5	+2.9
Registered electors		65,710		
Labour hold		Swing		

2010 general election: Kingston upon Hull East
Party	Candidate	Votes	%	±%
Labour	Karl Turner	16,387	47.9	−8.9
Liberal Democrats	Jeremy Wilcock	7,790	22.8	+3.9
Conservative	Christine Mackay	5,667	16.6	+3.6
UKIP	Mike Hookem	2,745	8.0	New
National Front	Joe Uttley	880	2.6	New
English Democrat	Michael Burton	715	2.1	New
Majority		8,597	25.1	−12.8
Turnout		34,184	50.6	+3.2
Registered electors		67,530		
Labour hold		Swing	−6.4	

=== Elections in the 2000s ===
2005 general election: Kingston upon Hull East
Party	Candidate	Votes	%	±%
Labour	John Prescott	17,609	56.6	−8.0
Liberal Democrats	Andy Sloan	5,862	18.8	+3.9
Conservative	Katy Lindsay	4,138	13.3	−0.5
BNP	Alan Siddle	1,022	3.3	New
Liberal	Janet Toker	1,018	3.3	New
Veritas	Graham Morris	750	2.4	New
Independent	Roland Noon	334	1.1	New
Socialist Labour	Linda Muir	207	0.7	−2.0
Legalise Cannabis	Carl Wagner	182	0.6	New
Majority		11,747	37.8	−8.6
Turnout		31,122	45.2	−1.2
Labour hold		Swing	−5.9	

2001 general election: Kingston upon Hull East
Party	Candidate	Votes	%	±%
Labour	John Prescott	19,938	64.6	−6.7
Liberal Democrats	Jo Swinson	4,613	14.9	+5.1
Conservative	Sandip Verma	4,276	13.8	+0.1
UKIP	Jeanette Jenkinson	1,218	3.9	New
Socialist Labour	Linda Muir	830	2.7	New
Majority		15,325	49.7	−7.9
Turnout		30,875	46.4	−12.5
Labour hold		Swing		

=== Elections in the 1990s ===
1997 general election: Kingston upon Hull East
Party	Candidate	Votes	%	±%
Labour	John Prescott	28,870	71.3	+8.4
Conservative	Angus West	5,552	13.7	−10.1
Liberal Democrats	Jim Wastling	3,965	9.8	−2.8
Referendum	Gordon Rogers	1,788	4.4	New
ProLife Alliance	Margaret Nolan	190	0.5	New
Natural Law	David Whitley	121	0.3	−0.4
Majority		23,318	57.6	+18.5
Turnout		40,486	58.9	−10.4
Labour hold		Swing	+9.2	

1992 general election: Kingston upon Hull East
Party	Candidate	Votes	%	±%
Labour	John Prescott	30,096	62.9	+6.6
Conservative	John L. Fareham	11,373	23.8	−2.2
Liberal Democrats	James H. Wastling	6,050	12.6	−5.1
Natural Law	Cliff Kinzell	323	0.7	New
Majority		18,723	39.1	+8.8
Turnout		47,842	69.3	−1.3
Labour hold		Swing	+4.4	

=== Elections in the 1980s ===
1987 general election: Kingston upon Hull East
Party	Candidate	Votes	%	±%
Labour	John Prescott	27,287	56.3	+6.4
Conservative	Philip Jackson	12,598	26.0	−2.6
Liberal	Timothy John Wright	8,572	17.7	−3.8
Majority		14,689	30.3	+9.0
Turnout		48,457	70.6	+3.0
Labour hold		Swing		

1983 general election: Kingston upon Hull East
Party	Candidate	Votes	%	±%
Labour	John Prescott	23,615	49.9	
Conservative	Dennis Leng	13,541	28.6	
Liberal	Christine Grurevitch	10,172	21.5	
Majority		10,074	21.3	
Turnout		47,328	67.6	
Labour hold		Swing		

=== Elections in the 1970s ===
1979 general election: Kingston upon Hull East
Party	Candidate	Votes	%	±%
Labour	John Prescott	39,411	62.51	
Conservative	M. M. B. Bean	15,719	24.93	
Liberal	M. J. Horne	7,543	11.96	
National Front	D. J. Matson	374	0.59	New
Majority		23,692	37.58	
Turnout		63,047	70.82	
Labour hold		Swing		

October 1974 general election: Kingston upon Hull East
Party	Candidate	Votes	%	±%
Labour	John Prescott	34,190	62.41	
Conservative	Stephen Dorrell	10,397	18.98	
Liberal	J. Adamson	10,196	18.61	New
Majority		23,793	43.43	
Turnout		54,783	67.12	
Labour hold		Swing		

February 1974 general election: Kingston upon Hull East
Party	Candidate	Votes	%	±%
Labour	John Prescott	41,300	69.99	
Conservative	E. D. M. Todd	17,707	30.01	
Majority		23,593	39.98	
Turnout		59,007	73.14	
Labour hold		Swing		

1970 general election: Kingston upon Hull East
Party	Candidate	Votes	%	±%
Labour	John Prescott	36,859	71.44	
Conservative	Norman Lamont	14,736	28.56	
Majority		22,123	42.88	
Turnout		51,595	68.18	
Labour hold		Swing		

=== Elections in the 1960s ===
1966 general election: Kingston upon Hull East
Party	Candidate	Votes	%	±%
Labour	Harry Pursey	34,457	65.46	
Conservative	Maude Heath	11,385	21.63	
Liberal	Norman W. Turner	6,795	12.91	
Majority		23,072	43.83	
Turnout		52,637	73.42	
Labour hold		Swing		

1964 general election: Kingston upon Hull East
Party	Candidate	Votes	%	±%
Labour	Harry Pursey	30,634	56.00	
Conservative	Maude Heath	13,284	26.11	
Liberal	Norman W. Turner	9,781	17.88	
Majority		17,350	29.89	
Turnout		53,699	74.78	
Labour hold		Swing		

=== Elections in the 1950s ===
1959 general election: Kingston upon Hull East
Party	Candidate	Votes	%	±%
Labour	Harry Pursey	30,667	52.55	
Conservative	Maude Heath	17,648	30.24	
Liberal	John J. MacCallum	10,043	17.21	
Majority		13,019	22.31	
Turnout		58,358	80.56	
Labour hold		Swing		

1955 general election: Kingston upon Hull East
Party	Candidate	Votes	%	±%
Labour	Harry Pursey	28,990	55.20	
Conservative	Harry Richman	16,284	31.01	
Liberal	John J. MacCallum	7,242	13.79	
Majority		12,706	24.19	
Turnout		52,516	75.66	
Labour hold		Swing		

1951 general election: Kingston upon Hull East
Party	Candidate	Votes	%	±%
Labour	Harry Pursey	27,892	57.07	
Conservative	Harry Richman	16,368	33.49	
Liberal	Ronald W. Sykes	4,611	9.44	
Majority		11,524	23.58	
Turnout		48,871	84.22	
Labour hold		Swing		

1950 general election: Kingston upon Hull East
Party	Candidate	Votes	%	±%
Labour	Harry Pursey	26,903	56.20	
Conservative	William John Cornelis Heyting	13,988	29.22	
Liberal	Thomas Ernest Dalton	6,981	14.58	
Majority		12,915	26.98	
Turnout		47,872	85.28	
Labour hold		Swing		

=== Elections in the 1940s ===
1945 general election: Kingston upon Hull East
Party	Candidate	Votes	%	±%
Labour	Harry Pursey	19,443	64.25	
Conservative	Rupert Alec-Smith	7,439	24.58	
Liberal	Albert Edward Marshall	3,379	11.17	
Majority		12,004	39.67	
Turnout		30,261	75.61	
Labour hold		Swing		

=== Elections in the 1930s ===
1935 general election: Kingston upon Hull East
Party	Candidate	Votes	%	±%
Labour	George Muff	19,054	49.32	
Conservative	John Nation	15,448	39.98	
Liberal	Rodway Stephens	4,133	10.70	New
Majority		3,606	9.33	N/A
Turnout		38,615	75.63	
Labour gain from Conservative		Swing		

1931 general election: Kingston upon Hull East
Party	Candidate	Votes	%	±%
Conservative	John Nation	24,003	57.11	
Labour	George Muff	18,026	42.89	
Majority		5,977	14.22	N/A
Turnout		42,029	83.24	
Conservative gain from Labour		Swing		

=== Elections in the 1920s ===
1929 general election: Kingston upon Hull East
Party	Candidate	Votes	%	±%
Labour	George Muff	20,023	48.8	+10.4
Unionist	Roger Lumley	13,810	33.6	−8.8
Liberal	Rodway Stephens	7,217	17.6	−0.1
Majority		6,213	15.2	N/A
Turnout		41,050	83.4	+1.6
Registered electors		49,212		
Labour gain from Unionist		Swing	+9.6	

1924 general election: Kingston upon Hull East
Party	Candidate	Votes	%	±%
Unionist	Roger Lumley	12,296	42.4	+3.9
Labour	George Muff	11,130	38.4	+11.5
Liberal	F. C. Thornborough	5,140	17.7	−16.9
Independent	W. E. Mashford	444	1.5	New
Majority		1,166	4.0	+0.1
Turnout		29,010	81.8	+2.4
Registered electors		35,467		
Unionist hold		Swing	−3.8	

C.J.Vasey

1923 general election: Kingston upon Hull East
Party	Candidate	Votes	%	±%
Unionist	Roger Lumley	10,657	38.5	−5.4
Liberal	Charles Vasey	9,600	34.6	+3.4
Labour	Archibald Stark	7,468	26.9	+2.0
Majority		1,057	3.9	−8.8
Turnout		27,725	79.4	−3.1
Registered electors		34,908		
Unionist hold		Swing	−4.4	

1922 general election: Kingston upon Hull East
Party	Candidate	Votes	%	±%
Unionist	Roger Lumley	12,248	43.9	−8.6
Liberal	Charles Vasey	8,711	31.2	+4.1
Labour	Archibald Stark	6,934	24.9	+4.5
Majority		3,537	12.7	−12.7
Turnout		27,893	82.5	+24.3
Registered electors		33,795		
Unionist hold		Swing	−6.9	

=== Elections in the 1910s ===
1918 general election: Kingston upon Hull East
Party		Candidate	Votes	%	±%
C	Unionist	Charles Murchison	9,566	52.5	+9.7
	Liberal	Thomas Ferens	4,947	27.1	−30.1
	Labour	R. H. Farrah	3,725	20.4	New
Majority			4,619	25.4	N/A
Turnout			18,238	58.2	−27.5
Registered electors			31,316		
	Unionist gain from Liberal		Swing	+19.9	
C indicates candidate endorsed by the coalition government.

December 1910 general election: Kingston upon Hull East
Party	Candidate	Votes	%	±%
Liberal	Thomas Ferens	7,196	57.2	−0.4
Conservative	R. M. Sebag-Montefiore	5,387	42.8	+0.4
Majority		1,809	14.4	−0.8
Turnout		12,583	85.7	−4.4
Registered electors		14,687		
Liberal hold		Swing	−0.4	

January 1910 general election: Kingston upon Hull East
Party	Candidate	Votes	%	±%
Liberal	Thomas Ferens	7,627	57.6	−2.8
Conservative	R. M. Sebag-Montefiore	5,611	42.4	+2.8
Majority		2,016	15.2	−5.6
Turnout		13,238	90.1	+2.9
Registered electors		14,687		
Liberal hold		Swing	−2.8	

=== Elections in the 1900s ===
1906 general election: Kingston upon Hull East
Party	Candidate	Votes	%	±%
Liberal	Thomas Ferens	6,881	60.4	+14.7
Conservative	L. R. Davies	4,519	39.6	−14.7
Majority		2,362	20.8	N/A
Turnout		11,400	87.2	+6.9
Registered electors		13,073		
Liberal gain from Conservative		Swing	+14.7	

1900 general election: Kingston upon Hull East
Party	Candidate	Votes	%	±%
Conservative	Thomas Firbank	5,264	54.3	+3.4
Liberal	Thomas Ferens	4,428	45.7	−3.4
Majority		836	8.6	+6.8
Turnout		9,692	80.3	−0.9
Registered electors		12,066		
Conservative hold		Swing	+3.4	

=== Elections in the 1890s ===
1895 general election: Kingston upon Hull East
Party	Candidate	Votes	%	±%
Conservative	Thomas Firbank	4,305	50.9	+5.9
Liberal	Clarence Smith	4,152	49.1	−5.9
Majority		153	1.8	N/A
Turnout		8,457	81.2	−4.7
Registered electors		10,419		
Conservative gain from Liberal		Swing	+5.9	

1892 general election: Kingston upon Hull East
Party	Candidate	Votes	%	±%
Liberal	Clarence Smith	4,570	55.0	+5.3
Conservative	Frederick Brent Grotrian	3,738	45.0	−5.3
Majority		832	10.0	N/A
Turnout		8,308	85.9	+8.4
Registered electors		9,677		
Liberal gain from Conservative		Swing	+5.3	

=== Elections in the 1880s ===
1886 general election: Kingston upon Hull East
Party	Candidate	Votes	%	±%
Conservative	Frederick Brent Grotrian	3,139	50.3	+5.3
Liberal	William Saunders	3,102	49.7	−5.3
Majority		37	0.6	N/A
Turnout		6,241	77.5	−4.3
Registered electors		8,053		
Conservative gain from Liberal		Swing	+5.3	

1885 general election: Kingston upon Hull East
Party	Candidate	Votes	%
Liberal	William Saunders	3,625	55.0
Conservative	Frederick Brent Grotrian	2,960	45.0
Majority		665	10.0
Turnout		6,585	81.8
Registered electors		8,053	
Liberal win (new seat)			

== See also ==
- List of parliamentary constituencies in Humberside
- List of parliamentary constituencies in the Yorkshire and the Humber (region)
- List of areas in Kingston upon Hull
