= Thomas Firbank (politician) =

British politician

Sir Thomas Firbank

Member of Parliament for Kingston upon Hull East
- In office July 1895 – 1906

Personal details
- Born: 16 May 1850
- Died: 7 October 1910 (aged 60)
- Party: Conservative Party
- Occupation: Politician

Major Sir Joseph Thomas Firbank (16 May 1850 – 7 October 1910) was a British Conservative Party politician.

== Early life ==
Joseph Thomas Firbank was born in Britain in 1850. He was one of seven children of Joseph Firbank (1819–1886), who had begun work at the age of seven in a Durham coal-mine but had become a prosperous railway contractor in South Wales and elsewhere.

== Political career ==
In 1885, Thomas Firbank's father Joseph became High Sheriff of Monmouthshire.

Thomas Firbank became High Sheriff of Monmouthshire in 1891. At the general election in July 1895, he was elected as the member of parliament (MP) for Kingston upon Hull East. He was re-elected in 1900 but left the Commons before the 1906 general election.

He was knighted in the 1902 Coronation Honours, receiving the accolade from King Edward VII at Buckingham Palace on 24 October that year.

== Personal life ==
Firbank lived in South Wales, at St Julians, Newport, but also in London at Clarges Street and from 1886 at the Coopers, Chislehurst.

In 1883, Firbank married Jane Harriette Garrett (1851–1924). They had four children: Joseph Sydney (1884–1904), Arthur Annesley Ronald (1886–1926, who became celebrated as the novelist Ronald Firbank), Hubert Somerset (1887–1913, the father of the author Thomas Joseph Firbank, who wrote I Bought a Mountain, I Bought a Star and other books) and Heather (1888–1954).

In Who's Who he described himself as "keen on all outdoor sports and athletics, music and objects of art."

He died of heart failure in Tunbridge Wells in 1910. His widow died in 1924.

Parliament of the United Kingdom
Preceded by Sir Clarence Smith	Member of Parliament for Kingston upon Hull East; 1895 – 1906	Succeeded by Thomas Ferens
