= Karl Turner =

British politician (born 1971)

Karl Turner MP
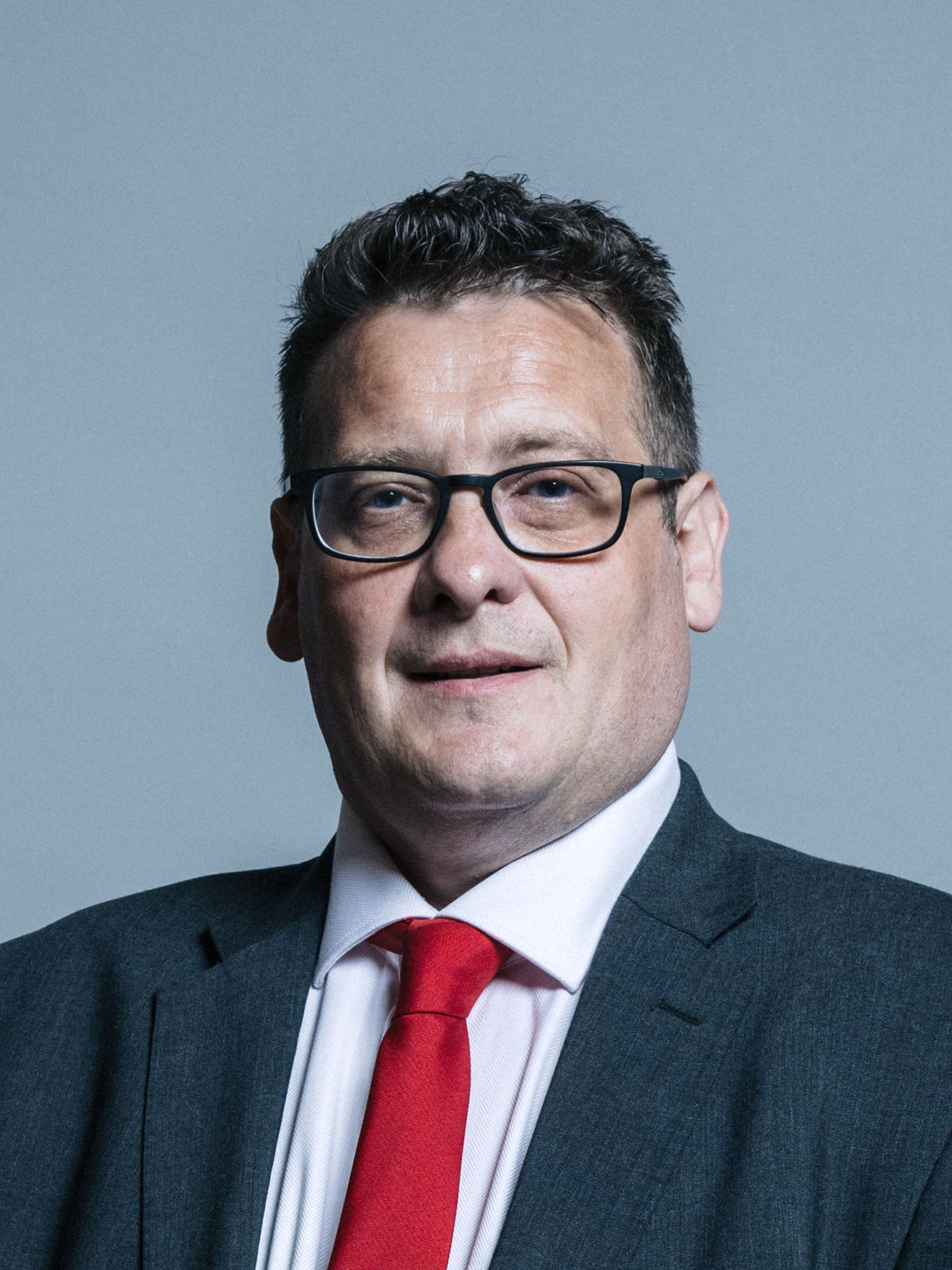
- Official portrait, 2017

Member of Parliament for Kingston upon Hull East
- Incumbent
- Assumed office 6 May 2010
- Preceded by: John Prescott
- Majority: 3,920 (13.2%)
Shadow portfolios
Shadow Cabinet
2016	Attorney General
Shadow Frontbench
2023–2024	Solicitor General
2020–2021	Legal Aid
2017–2020	Shipping, Aviation and Road Safety
2016–2017	Whip
2015–2016	Justice
2014–2016	Solicitor General
2013–2015	Whip

Personal details
- Born: Karl William Turner; 15 April 1971 (age 55) Kingston upon Hull, East Riding of Yorkshire, England
- Party: Labour
- Education: University of Hull; Northumbria University
- Website: www.karlturnermp.org.uk

Karl William Turner (born 15 April 1971) is a British politician who has been the Member of Parliament (MP) for Kingston upon Hull East since 2010. He sat as an independent MP after he was suspended from the Parliamentary Labour Party (PLP) from 31 March 2026 to 21 October 2026, when he was reinstated to the PLP after a public apology.

== Early life and career ==
Karl Turner was born on 15 April 1971 in Kingston upon Hull. He was raised in the city and was educated at Bransholme High School from 1984 to 1987, leaving at the age of 16. He attended HCC Training to study business administration from 1987 to 1989. Later, Turner became a self-employed antiques dealer.

He returned to formal schooling in the late 1990s to study A Levels at Hull College. He then studied law as a mature student at Leeds Metropolitan University, graduating in 2004.

Turner became a barrister in 2005 after passing the Bar Vocational Course at Northumbria University and went on to practise criminal law for the Max Gold Partnership in Hull.

== Parliamentary career ==
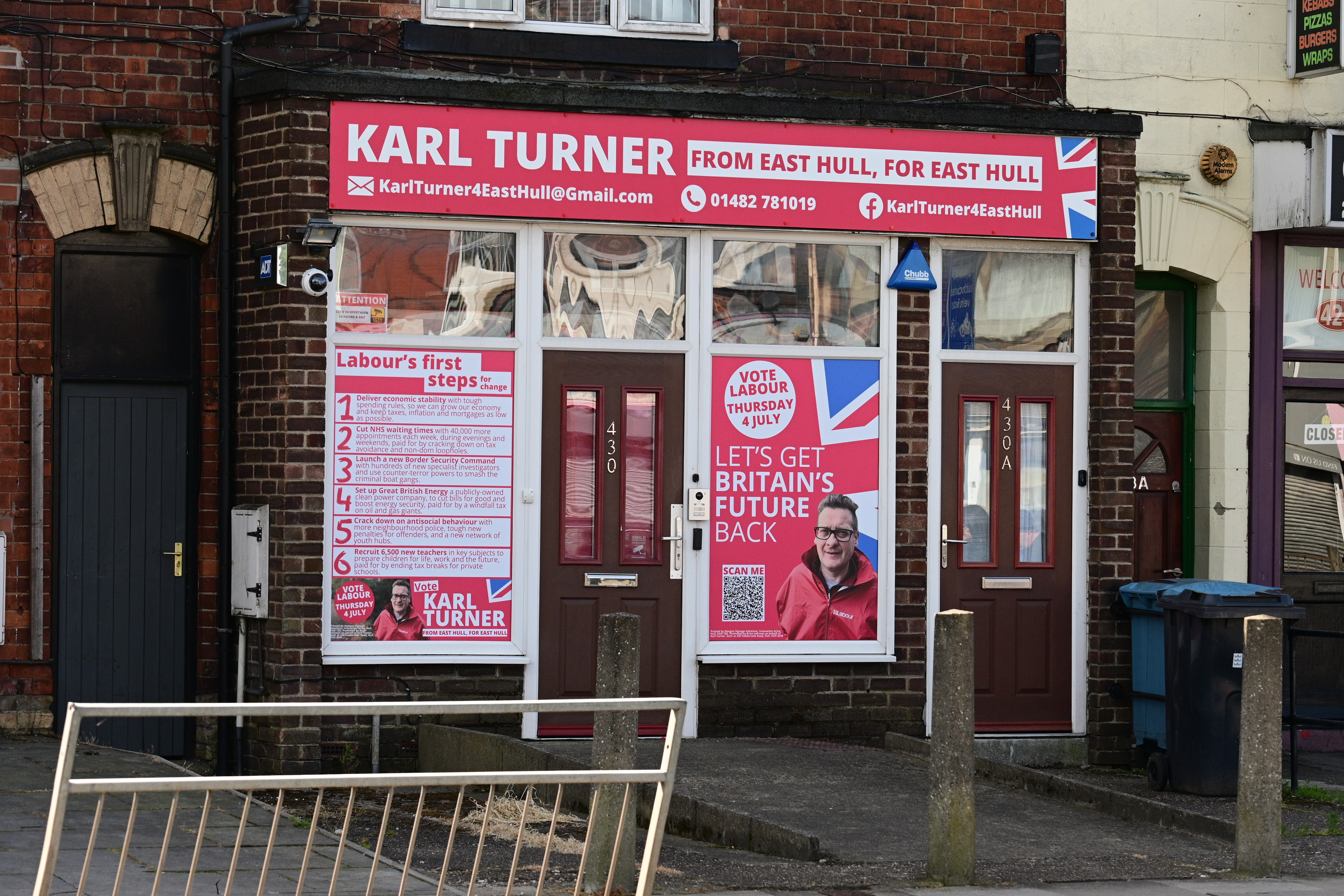
Turner's constituency office on Holderness Road in Kingston upon Hull ahead of the 2024 general election

Turner was selected by the Labour Party as their candidate for Kingston upon Hull East in March 2008. At the 2010 general election, Turner was elected to Parliament as MP for Kingston upon Hull East with 47.9% of the vote and a majority of 8,597.

In April 2014, Turner referred himself to the Parliamentary Commissioner for Standards after complaints were made in relation to invitations to a £45-a-head Labour Party fundraising event, sent using parliamentary email accounts. The Commissioner for Standards concluded that there should be no inquiry.

Turner was appointed Shadow Solicitor General by Labour leader Ed Miliband on 3 December 2014, and continued to serve as an opposition whip.

At the 2015 general election, Turner was re-elected as MP for Kingston upon Hull East with an increased vote share of 51.7% and an increased majority of 10,319.

On 11 January 2016, Turner was appointed Shadow Attorney General for England and Wales to replace Catherine McKinnell, who resigned following a reshuffle to the Corbyn shadow cabinet. On 26 June 2016, Turner resigned from the Shadow Cabinet following the EU referendum, among a number of his colleagues unhappy with Jeremy Corbyn's leadership. He supported Owen Smith in the 2016 Labour leadership election. On 14 October 2016, it was announced that Turner had returned to Labour's frontbench as a whip.

Turner was again re-elected at the snap 2017 general election with an increased vote share of 58.3% and an increased majority of 10,396. Following the election, he was appointed as Shadow Shipping, Aviation and Road Safety Minister within the Shadow Transport team.

On 12 March 2018, allegations of sexual misconduct against Turner were reported in the British press. Turner, via his solicitors, denied making any such comments or behaving inappropriately. The Labour Party said it had not received a formal complaint and that complaints about inappropriate behaviour are taken "extremely seriously".

In September 2019, Speaker of the House John Bercow described Turner as the "noisiest member of the House".

At the 2019 general election, Turner was again re-elected, with a decreased vote share of 39.2% and a decreased majority of 1,239.

Turner is a member of the Labour Friends of Israel group in Parliament.

In August 2023, Turner apologised after sharing a doctored image of Prime Minister Rishi Sunak on Twitter.

At the 2024 general election, Turner was again re-elected, with an increased vote share of 43.8% and an increased majority of 3,920.

Turner has criticised planned reforms by the Starmer government to limit jury trials. He has described the idea as "ludicrous", and has said that he would consider resigning from his seat to trigger a by-election if the proposal succeeded. Turner cited his own experience with the criminal justice system as reasoning, saying that he had been charged with handling stolen goods in 2002 while working as an antiques dealer, and the case was thrown out due to lack of evidence in the face of a jury trial. He was the only Labour MP to vote for a Conservative motion in support of retaining jury trials.

On 31 March 2026, Turner had the Labour whip suspended after giving an interview to campaigner Jody McIntyre, who stood against Labour MP Jess Phillips in the 2024 general election. He was reinstated on 21 October 2026 on a "probationary basis" after a public apology.

Turner has also been an outspoken critic of senior Labour figures. Shortly before the suspension, he called former Downing Street Chief of Staff Morgan McSweeney "McSwindle" and alleged that he staged the theft of a mobile phone.

== Personal life ==
He is married to Leanne Turner, who is a criminal law solicitor and part-time judge.

Parliament of the United Kingdom
Preceded by John Prescott	Member of Parliament for Kingston upon Hull East; 2010–present	Incumbent
Political offices
Preceded by Catherine McKinnell	Shadow Attorney General for England and Wales; 2016	Succeeded by Shami Chakrabarti
