= Frederick Brent Grotrian =

British politician (1838–1905)

F. B. Grotrian
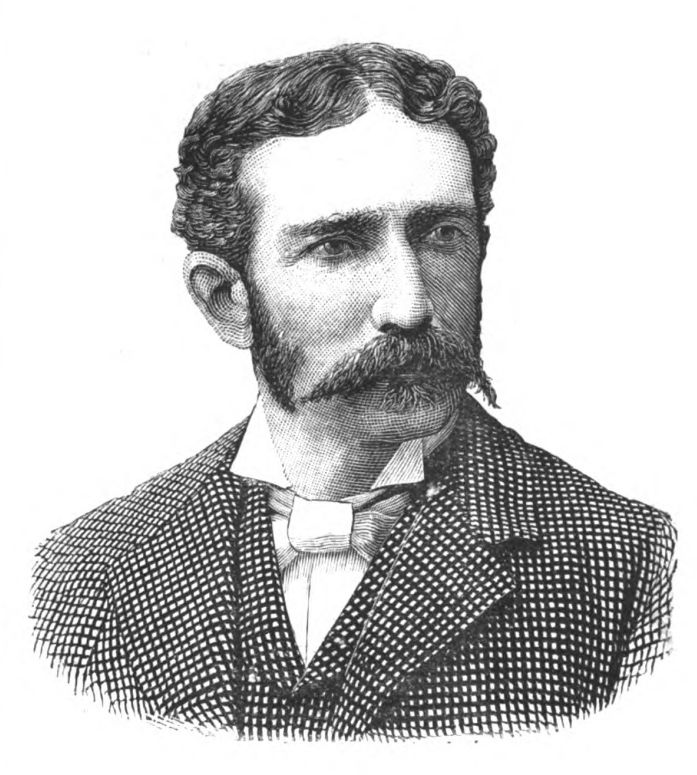
- Born: 1838
- Died: 8 April 1905

Frederick Brent Grotrian (1838–1905) was an English Conservative Member of Parliament for Kingston upon Hull East constituency (1886–1892).

== Early life ==
Frederick Brent Grotrian was son of Frederick Ludwig Christian Grotrian, of London and Brighton, East Sussex, who had been a certificated master in the Merchant Navy, and Amelia, daughter of Samuel Brent, of London and Horndean, Hampshire.

== Career ==
Grotrian was founder of the Hull Daily Mail (1889), member of the Hull Chamber of Commerce, and one of the founders of the Drypool and Marfleet Steam Tramways Company.

== Personal life ==
In 1862 Grotian married Elizabeth (died 1930), daughter of John Hunter, of Felixkirk, formerly of Cawton, Gilling East, North Yorkshire, yeoman, one of the three principal landowners at Cawton (this "small village and township" comprising 1,020 acres and home to 89 people in 1840) along with the Tindall and Shepherd families; one of their eight children, second of four sons, was Sir Herbert Brent Grotrian. Grotrian lived at Ingmanthorpe Hall, Wetherby, West Yorkshire, having previously lived at West Hill House, Hessle, East Riding of Yorkshire. Another child, his daughter Gwendolen, married the artist James McBryde and under her married name was known as an artist, and as a writer for The Guardian's "Country Diary" column.

Parliament of the United Kingdom
Preceded by William Saunders	Member of Parliament for Kingston upon Hull East; 1886–1892	Succeeded by Clarence Smith
