= John Nation =

Brigadier-General John Nation CVO DSO
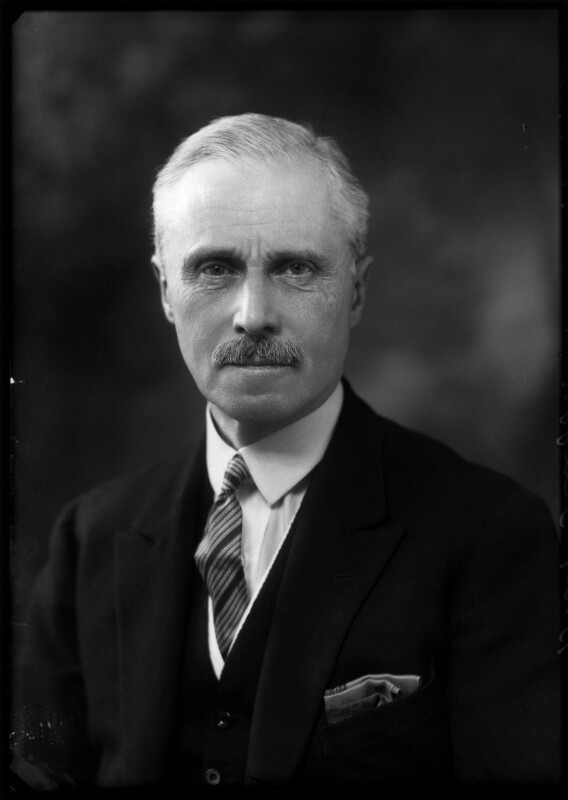
- Nation in 1931
- Born: 12 May 1874
- Died: 11 May 1946 (aged 71)
- Military career
- Allegiance: United Kingdom
- Branch: British Army
- Rank: Brigadier-General
- Conflicts: First World War; Second World War
- Awards: CVO, DSO

Member of Parliament for Kingston upon Hull East
- In office 27 October 1931 – 25 October 1935
- Preceded by: George Muff
- Succeeded by: George Muff

Brigadier-General John James Henry Nation, CVO, DSO (5 December 1874 – 5 November 1946) was a British Army officer who became a Conservative Party politician.

== Career ==
Nation was commissioned a second lieutenant in the Royal Engineers on 1 April 1895, and promoted to lieutenant on 1 April 1898. He served in the Second Boer War in South Africa from 1899 to 1902. He was first posted in the Orange Free State, including engagements at Vet River and Zand River; later in the Transvaal, where he was present at actions near Johannesburg and Pretoria, including the battles of Diamond Hill (June 1900) and Belfast (August 1900); and eventually in Cape Colony, south of the Orange River. Following the end of the war in June 1902, he left Cape Town for England on the SS Moravian in August 1902. He was stationed in Buncrana in 1903.

Nation served in the First World War, receiving a temporary promotion to brigadier general in November 1917, and at the headquarter of Marshal Foch 1918–19. From 1927 to 1931 he was Military attaché Rome. He was elected at the 1931 general election as Member of Parliament (MP) for Kingston upon Hull East, defeating the sitting Labour MP George Muff. At the 1935 general election, Nation lost the seat to Muff, and never stood for election to the House of Commons again.

General Nation worked as a war correspondent with the BEF. In 1940 he became Zone Commander of the Home Guard (United Kingdom) until 1942.

== Family ==
He was married to Olive Elizabeth, widow of Capt Walter Rubens.

Parliament of the United Kingdom
Preceded by George Muff	Member of Parliament for Kingston upon Hull East; 1931 – 1935	Succeeded by George Muff
