= Harry Pursey =

British politician and navy officer

Commander Harry Pursey

Member of Parliament for Kingston upon Hull East
- In office 5 July 1945 – 29 May 1970
- Preceded by: George Muff
- Succeeded by: John Prescott

Personal details
- Born: 24 August 1891 Sidmouth, Devon. England
- Died: 13 December 1980 (aged 89)
- Party: Labour
- Spouse: Lillian Maria Adler (m. 1954; div. 1959)

Military service
- Allegiance: United Kingdom
- Branch/service: Royal Navy
- Years of service: 1907–1936
- Rank: Commander
- Battles/wars: First World War; · Battle of Jutland

Harry Pursey (24 August 1891 – 13 December 1980) was a British politician and naval officer, who began his career as a boy seaman and served as a Member of Parliament for twenty-five years.

He was born in Sidmouth, and educated at the Royal Hospital School (a school for naval orphans) and the Royal Naval College in Greenwich. He joined the Royal Navy in 1907, as a boy seaman with HMS Impregnable.

During the First World War he served with the Dover Patrol and with the Grand Fleet; he took part in the Battle of Jutland aboard Revenge. In 1917 he was promoted to the rank of gunner and saw service in the Aegean aboard Forward; that October, he was second-in-command of a landing party from the Forward which successfully evacuated a Royal Naval Air Service station on Lesbos Island, for which he was commissioned and received a mention in dispatches.

After the war he was posted to the Black Sea and around Turkey, and saw action in Somaliland and Mesopotamia. He was promoted to Lieutenant in 1920. In 1926 he was posted to Benbow. He was promoted to Lieutenant-Commander in February 1928, and transferred to Vernon in April. In May 1929 he was appointed to Eagle and in March 1931 to Hood. He retired in 1936.

During the Spanish Civil War, he worked as a journalist in Spain.

He married first in 1921, then secondly in 1944 and was granted a decree nisi of divorce in 1956. He married again in September 1954, in New Jersey, to Baroness Huszar, a Hungarian. In 1954 his second wife was arrested in Montreal, for possessing counterfeit United States money, and acquitted after trial. He later won a lawsuit against her solicitor, who had argued that although he had conducted her defence without entering Canada, he was a licensed Canadian solicitor as well as an English one and thus not required to comply with English regulations. His wife was again, however, arrested in 1955, this time for the possession of narcotics; she was convicted, and they were divorced in 1959.

He was elected as the Labour member of parliament for Kingston upon Hull East in the 1945 general election. In the 1951 general election, he held the seat with a majority of 11,500 votes, rising to 12,700 votes in 1955, 17,300 votes in 1964, and 23,000 in 1966. He announced in 1967 that he would resign at the next election, and was succeeded by John Prescott in the 1970 election.

He had a great interest in "below-decks" naval history, and spent his later years working on a history of the Invergordon Mutiny, though it does not appear to have been published. His obituary in The Times described him as "the first naval officer promoted from the lower deck" to enter Parliament.

Parliament of the United Kingdom
Preceded by George Muff	Member of Parliament for Kingston upon Hull East; 1945 – 1970	Succeeded by John Prescott
