= Thomas Firbank =

Canadian writer (1910–2000)

Thomas Joseph Firbank (13 June 1910 – 1 December 2000) was a Canadian/Welsh author, farmer, soldier and engineer.

== Early life and education ==
He was born in Quebec, Canada, to an English father and a Welsh mother. His parents, Hubert Somerset Firbank, a railway contractor born in 1887 in Chislehurst, Kent (to Sir Joseph Thomas Firbank) and Gwendoline Louise Lewis, were married in 1909 in Dolgellau, Merionethshire, Wales. Following his father's early death, he was raised among his mother's hill-farming community in the Berwyn Mountains of North Wales. He was educated at Stowe School.

== Writing career ==
His first book, an autobiography entitled I Bought a Mountain (ISBN 978-1871083057), was published in 1940 and became a major international best-seller. It describes how, aged only 21, he bought Dyffryn Mymbyr farm, a 2,400-acre (9.7 km^{2}) sheep farm in Capel Curig, North Wales, in 1931 and painstakingly learned his trade, while portraying the beauty of Snowdonia. Firbank was a keen mountain walker, and the book includes a hair-raising account of how he and his two companions were possibly the first to ascend all of the Welsh 3000s in less than 9 hours. Firbank's first wife, Esmé Cummins, a Surrey-born actress whom he met in 1933, features prominently.

== Second World War ==
The book ends in pastoral calm with the approach of the Second World War, which drew Thomas Firbank away from the farm to enlist in the Coldstream Guards. He was later seconded to the newly formed Airborne Forces with whom he fought in North Africa, Italy and Arnhem, and was awarded the Military Cross. At the end of the war, as Lieutenant-Colonel, he commanded the Airborne Forces Depot on the Isle of Wight. His book I Bought a Star (ISBN 978-1871083965, pub. 1951) describes his war-time experiences with the 1st Airborne Division.

His marriage ended during the Second World War, both parties finding new partners. In difficult postwar circumstances, he generously gave Esmé his farm in 1947, enabling her to remain there with her new partner. In 1967 she became an important founder member of the Snowdonia Society. After her death the farm was donated to the National Trust.

== Later life ==
Log Hut (pub. George G. Harrap, 1954) details his experiences in a bungalow on the north-east edge of Dartmoor.

A Country of Memorable Honour (ISBN 978-1871083217, pub. 1953) describes a walking tour through Wales with fascinating characters at every turn. This tour was a farewell to the old country before moving to Japan to open up the Far East for a British engineering firm.

A novel entitled Bride to the Mountain (pub. Harrap 1940, reprinted C. Chivers Dec. 1965, then again by Portway Reprints under ISBN 0-85594-175-8) was written shortly after the success of I Bought A Mountain and draws heavily on the same experiences. It also appears to be largely based on an actual 1927 case when a strong but insane climber called Giveen caused the deaths of two others.

In 1954 he inherited his aunt Heather Firbank's huge collection of clothes, which were then donated to the Victoria and Albert Museum.

He returned to Snowdonia in 1993, and lived at Elen's Castle Hotel in Dolwyddelan for some time and wrote further articles on conservation. He died in December 2000 in Llanrwst, Conwy, North Wales

== See also ==
- Obituary
