= Roger Lumley, 11th Earl of Scarbrough =

British Conservative politician and British Army general (1896–1969)

Major-General The Right Honourable The Earl of Scarbrough KG GCSI GCIE GCVO TD PC DL
- Lumley in 1943

Governor of Bombay
- In office 18 September 1937 – 24 March 1943
- Preceded by: Robert Duncan Bell
- Succeeded by: John Colville

Under-Secretary of State for India and Burma
- In office 1945
- Preceded by: The Earl of Listowel
- Succeeded by: Arthur Henderson

Member of Parliament for York
- In office 27 October 1931 – 6 May 1937
- Preceded by: Frederick George Burgess
- Succeeded by: Charles Wood

Member of Parliament for Kingston upon Hull East
- In office 15 November 1922 – 10 May 1929
- Preceded by: George Murchison
- Succeeded by: George Muff

Personal details
- Born: Lawrence Roger Lumley; 27 July 1896 Northumberland, England
- Died: 29 June 1969 (aged 72) Rotherham, West Riding of Yorkshire, England
- Party: Conservative
- Spouse: Katherine Isobel McEwen (m. 1922)
- Children: 5 (including Richard)
- Education: Eton College
- Alma mater: Magdalen College, Oxford

Military service
- Allegiance: United Kingdom
- Branch/service: British Army
- Years of service: 1916–1946
- Rank: Major-general
- Unit: 11th Hussars; Yorkshire Dragoons; King's Own Yorkshire Light Infantry
- Battles/wars: First World War; Second World War

Lawrence Roger Lumley, 11th Earl of Scarbrough, KG, GCSI, GCIE, GCVO, TD, PC, DL (27 July 1896 – 29 June 1969) was a British Conservative politician and British Army general.

== Background ==
Lumley was the son of Brigadier General Osbert Lumley (1857–1923), youngest child and son of the Richard Lumley, 9th Earl of Scarbrough. His mother was Constance Ellinor Wilson-Patten (1864–1933), granddaughter of John Wilson-Patten, 1st Baron Winmarleigh. He attended Eton College and Magdalen College, Oxford.

== Career ==
Lumley followed his father into the military, passing out from the Royal Military College, Sandhurst. He was commissioned a second lieutenant in the 11th Hussars on 26 January 1916, and was promoted to lieutenant on 26 July 1917. He served in France during World War I. He was demobilised on 3 June 1919, with the rank of lieutenant, but retained a reserve lieutenant's commission in the 11th Hussars, as well as being attached to the Yorkshire Dragoons. From 1920 to 1921, he was attached to an Officer Training Corps (OTC) University Contingent, with the local rank of captain.

Lumley sat in the House of Commons as Member of Parliament (MP) for Kingston upon Hull East 1922–29, then York 1931–37. In 1923 he was Parliamentary Private Secretary to William Ormsby-Gore, from 1924 to 1926 to Sir Austen Chamberlain and subsequently to Anthony Eden. On 8 March 1931, he was promoted to captain in the reserves in both the 11th Hussars and the Yorkshire Dragoons. He was brevetted to the rank of major in the Yorkshire Dragoons on 1 January 1937, and was awarded the Efficiency Decoration on 11 May. In 1937, he was appointed Governor of Bombay, serving until 1943, when he was appointed Knight Grand Commander of the Order of the Star of India. Upon his return from India, Lumley served as acting major-general in World War II, serving as Chief of Civil Affairs, War Office. Following the War, he continued his connections with the Army, as an honorary colonel. He succeeded to the Earldom of Scarbrough in 1945 following the death of his uncle. He served as Lord Chamberlain from 1952 to 1963 and chancellor of the University of Durham from 1958 to 1969. He was made a Knight Companion of the Order of the Garter in 1948.

Outside politics, the Earl had a keen interest in Asian and African studies. He presided over the Interdepartmental Commission of Enquiry on Oriental, Slavonic, East European and African Studies set up after the Second World War to consider how Britain might maintain and increase the links it had built up during the war in the geographical areas under the Commission's consideration. The Commission's report, presented in 1947, argued for considerable strengthening of university departments' capacity to carry out research and training related to these areas, and for significant funds to be made available to this end. However, after five years of strong growth following the presentation of the Scarbrough report, in 1952 much of the funding was withdrawn.

Lumley was initiated into freemasonry on 3 May 1923 in Apollo University Lodge No 357 in Oxford. From 1940 to 1943 he served as the District Grand Master of Bombay. From 1951 to 1967 he served as the Grand Master of the United Grand Lodge of England, during which time he was also made an honorary member of Isaac Newton University Lodge when attending its centenary. Lumley, alongside Eric James, Baron James of Rusholme, was a patron of the Yorkshire Philosophical Society.

== Family ==
Lumley married Katherine Isobel McEwen, sister of Sir John McEwen, 1st Baronet on 12 July 1922 at St Margaret's, Westminster. They had five children:

- Lady Mary Constance Lumley (20 April 1923 – 23 January 1998); married Lt Col Roger Fleetwood-Hesketh
- Lady Elizabeth Lumley (b. 22 July 1925); married Christopher Beckett, 4th Baron Grimthorpe, had two sons and one daughter. Their elder son is Edward Beckett, 5th Baron Grimthorpe.
- Lady Anne Katharine Gabrielle Lumley (16 November 1928 – 2006); married Matthew White Ridley, 4th Viscount Ridley, had four children, one of whom is zoologist and writer Matt Ridley.
- Richard Aldred Lumley, 12th Earl of Scarbrough (5 December 1932 – 23 March 2004); married Lady Elizabeth Anne Ramsay (daughter of Simon Ramsay, 16th Earl of Dalhousie), had four children
- Lady Jane Lily Serena Lumley (5 October 1935 – 15 March 2016); married the American show jumper Hugh Wiley (1929–1999), had three sons.

Parliament of the United Kingdom
Preceded by Charles Murchison	Member of Parliament for Kingston upon Hull East; 1922–1929	Succeeded by George Muff
Preceded by Frederick George Burgess	Member of Parliament for York; 1931–1937	Succeeded by Charles Wood
Political offices
Preceded by The Lord Brabourne	Governor of Bombay; 1937–1943	Succeeded by Sir David Colville
Preceded by Earl of Listowel	Under-Secretary of State for India and Burma; 1945	Succeeded by Arthur Henderson
Court offices
Preceded by The Earl of Clarendon	Lord Chamberlain; 1952–1963	Succeeded by The Lord Cobbold
Honorary titles
Preceded by The Earl of Harewood	Lord Lieutenant of the West Riding of Yorkshire; 1948–1969	Succeeded by Kenneth Hargreaves
Masonic offices
Preceded by The Duke of Devonshire	Grand Master of the United Grand Lodge of England; 1951–1967	Succeeded by The Duke of Kent
Academic offices
Preceded by George Macaulay Trevelyan	Chancellor of the University of Durham; 1958–1969	Succeeded by Malcolm Macdonald
Peerage of England
Preceded by Aldred Lumley	Earl of Scarbrough; 1945–1969	Succeeded by Richard Lumley
