= John Prescott =

Deputy Prime Minister of the United Kingdom from 1997 to 2007

The Right Honourable The Lord Prescott
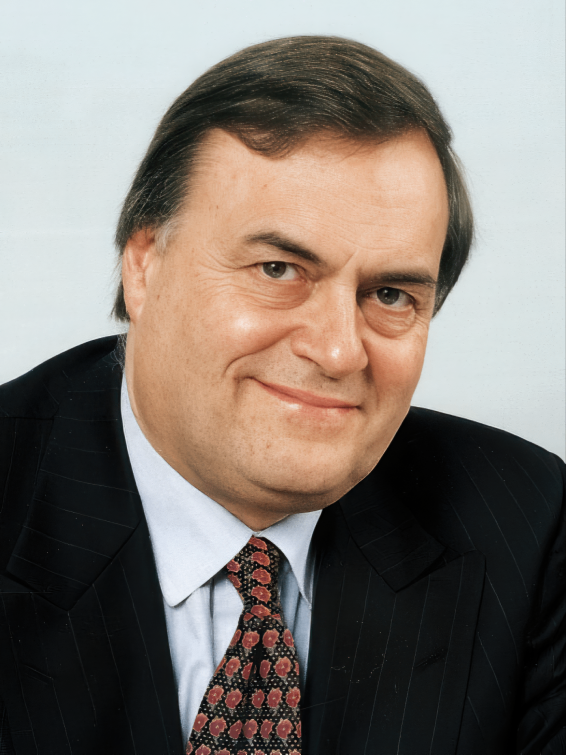
- Official portrait, c. 1997

Deputy Prime Minister of the United Kingdom
- In office 2 May 1997 – 27 June 2007
- Monarch: Elizabeth II
- Prime Minister: Tony Blair
- Preceded by: Michael Heseltine
- Succeeded by: Nick Clegg (Note: Office not in use from 27 June 2007 to 12 May 2010)

Deputy Leader of the Labour Party
- In office 21 July 1994 – 24 June 2007
- Leader: Tony Blair
- Preceded by: Margaret Beckett
- Succeeded by: Harriet Harman

First Secretary of State
- In office 8 June 2001 – 27 June 2007
- Prime Minister: Tony Blair
- Preceded by: Michael Heseltine (Note: Office not in use from 2 May 1997 to 8 June 2001)
- Succeeded by: Peter Mandelson (Note: Office not in use from 27 June 2007 to 5 June 2009)

Secretary of State for the Environment, Transport and the Regions
- In office 2 May 1997 – 8 June 2001
- Prime Minister: Tony Blair
- Preceded by: John Gummer (Environment); George Young (Transport)
- Succeeded by: Margaret Beckett (Environment, Food and Rural Affairs); Stephen Byers (Transport, Local Government and the Regions)

Secretary of State for Local Government and the Regions
- In office 29 May 2002 – 5 May 2007
- Prime Minister: Tony Blair
- Preceded by: Office established (Note: Responsibilities transferred from Department for Transport, Local Government and the Regions to the office of the Deputy Prime Minister following the resignation of Stephen Byers)
- Succeeded by: Ruth Kelly (Note: as Secretary of State for Communities and Local Government)

Member of the House of Lords
- Lord Temporal
- Life peerage 7 July 2010 – 9 July 2024

Member of Parliament for Kingston upon Hull East
- In office 18 June 1970 – 12 April 2010
- Preceded by: Harry Pursey
- Succeeded by: Karl Turner

Member of the European Parliament for the United Kingdom
- In office 1 July 1975 – 16 July 1979
Shadow cabinet posts
Shadow Secretary of State for Employment
In office 21 October 1993 – 21 July 1994
Leader	John Smith; Margaret Beckett (interim)
Preceded by	Frank Dobson
Succeeded by	Harriet Harman
In office 26 October 1984 – 13 July 1987
Leader	Neil Kinnock
Preceded by	John Smith
Succeeded by	Michael Meacher
Shadow Secretary of State for Transport
In office 23 November 1988 – 21 October 1993
Leader	Neil Kinnock; John Smith
Preceded by	Robert Hughes
Succeeded by	Frank Dobson
In office 31 October 1983 – 26 October 1984
Leader	Neil Kinnock
Preceded by	Albert Booth
Succeeded by	Gwyneth Dunwoody
Shadow Secretary of State for Energy
In office 13 July 1987 – 23 November 1988
Leader	Neil Kinnock
Preceded by	Stan Orme
Succeeded by	Tony Blair

Personal details
- Born: John Leslie Prescott; 31 May 1938 Prestatyn, Flintshire, Wales
- Died: 20 November 2024 (aged 86) Kingston upon Hull, East Riding of Yorkshire, England
- Party: Labour
- Spouse: Pauline Tilston (m. 1961)
- Children: 2
- Education: University of Hull (BSc)
- John Prescott's voice Prescott briefs the European Parliament on the results of the Kyoto Conference on Climate Change; Recorded 17 February 1998

John Leslie Prescott, Baron Prescott (31 May 1938 – 20 November 2024) was a British politician who served as Deputy Prime Minister of the United Kingdom from 1997 to 2007 and as First Secretary of State from 2001 to 2007.

A member of the Labour Party, he was Member of Parliament (MP) for Kingston upon Hull East for 40 years, from 1970 to 2010. He was often seen as the political link to the working class in a Labour Party increasingly led by modernising, middle-class professionals such as Tony Blair and Peter Mandelson (although Prescott described himself as "pretty middle class"), and developed a reputation as a key conciliator in the often fractious relationship between Blair and Gordon Brown.

Born in Prestatyn, Wales, in his youth Prescott failed the eleven-plus entrance exam for grammar school and worked as a ship's steward and trade union activist. He went on to graduate from Ruskin College and the University of Hull. In the 1994 Labour leadership election, he stood for both the leadership and deputy leadership, winning election to the latter office. He was appointed deputy prime minister following Labour's victory in the 1997 election, with an expanded brief as Secretary of State for the Environment, Transport and the Regions until 2001, then subsequently as First Secretary of State until 2007. In June 2007, he resigned as deputy prime minister, coinciding with Blair's resignation as prime minister. Following an election within the Labour Party, he was replaced as deputy leader by Harriet Harman.

After retiring as a member of Parliament at the 2010 general election, Prescott was made a life peer and sat in the House of Lords until 2024. He stood unsuccessfully as the Labour candidate in the 2012 election to be the first police and crime commissioner for Humberside Police. Prescott resigned from the Privy Council in 2013 in protest against delays to the introduction of press regulation, of which he had become a proponent. In February 2015, he briefly returned to politics as an adviser to Labour leader Ed Miliband.

== Early life ==
Prescott was born in Prestatyn, Wales, on 31 May 1938 to John Herbert ("Bert") Prescott and Phyllis, née Parrish. Prescott's father was a railway signalman, Justice of the Peace, and Labour councillor. His family won a competition to find the "most typical British family of 1951". In 2009, he said: "I've always felt very proud of Wales and being Welsh ... I was born in Wales, went to school in Wales and my mother was Welsh. I'm Welsh. It's my place of birth, my country." He left Wales in 1942 at the age of four and was brought up initially in Brinsworth, Rotherham, in the West Riding of Yorkshire, England. He attended Brinsworth Manor School, where in 1949 he sat but failed the 11-Plus examination to attend Rotherham Grammar School. Shortly afterwards, his family moved to Upton-by-Chester, and he attended Grange Secondary Modern School in nearby Ellesmere Port.

Prescott became a steward and waiter in the Merchant Navy, working for Cunard, and was a left-wing union activist. Among the passengers was a former prime minister, Anthony Eden, recuperating after his resignation over the Suez Crisis. Prescott reportedly described Eden as a "real gentleman". Apart from serving Eden, who stayed in his cabin much of the time, Prescott also won several boxing contests, at which Eden presented the prizes. He married Pauline "Tilly" Tilston at Upton Church in Chester on 11 November 1961. He then went to Ruskin College, which specialises in courses for union officials, where he gained a diploma in economics and politics in 1965. In 1968, he obtained a BSc degree in economics and economic history from the University of Hull.

== Member of Parliament ==
Prescott returned to the National Union of Seamen as a full-time official before being elected to the House of Commons as Member of Parliament (MP) for Kingston upon Hull East in 1970, succeeding Commander Harry Pursey, the retiring Labour MP, and defeating the Conservative challenger Norman Lamont. He had previously attempted to become MP for Southport in 1966, but came in second place, approximately 9,500 votes behind the Conservative candidate. From July 1975 to 1979, he concurrently served as a Member of the European Parliament (MEP) and Leader of the Labour Group, when its members were nominated by the national Parliaments. In 1988 Prescott and Eric Heffer challenged Roy Hattersley for the deputy leadership of the party, but Hattersley was re-elected as deputy leader. Prescott stood again in the 1992 deputy leadership election, following Hattersley's retirement, but lost to Margaret Beckett.

Prescott held various posts in Labour's shadow cabinet, but his career was secured by an impassioned closing speech in the debate at the Labour Party Conference in 1993 on the introduction of "one member, one vote" for the selection and reselection of Labour Parliamentary candidates that helped swing the vote in favour of this reform. In 1994 Prescott was a candidate in the party leadership election that followed the death of leader John Smith, standing for the positions of both leader and deputy leader. Tony Blair won the leadership contest, with Prescott being elected deputy leader.

== Deputy Prime Minister ==
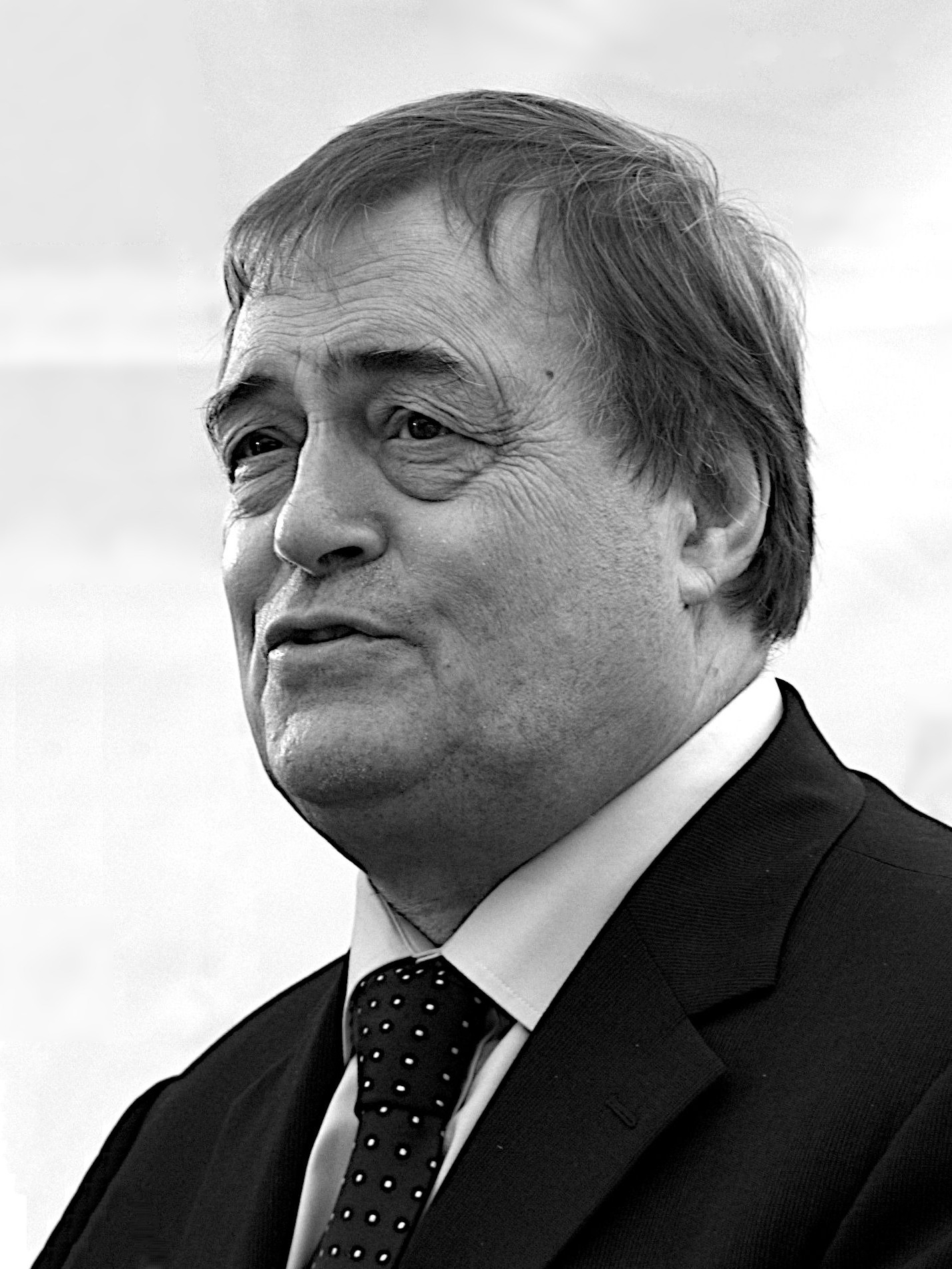
Prescott during his last day as Deputy Prime Minister, 27 June 2007

With the formation of a Labour government in 1997, Prescott was made Deputy Prime Minister and given a very large portfolio as the head of the newly created Department for Environment, Transport and the Regions. In the United Kingdom, the title of deputy prime minister is used only occasionally, and confers no constitutional powers (in which it is similar to the pre-20th century usage of prime minister). The deputy prime minister stands in when the prime minister is unavailable, most visibly at Prime Minister's Questions, and Prescott attended various heads of government meetings on behalf of Prime Minister Tony Blair.

Since the position of deputy prime minister draws no salary, Prescott's remuneration was based on his position as Secretary of State for the Environment, Transport and the Regions until 2001. This "super department" was then broken up, with the Department for Environment, Food and Rural Affairs and the Department for Transport established as separate entities. Prescott, still deputy prime minister, was also given the largely honorific title of First Secretary of State. In July 2001 an Office of the Deputy Prime Minister (ODPM) was created to administer the areas remaining under his responsibility. This was originally part of the Cabinet Office, but became a department in its own right in May 2002, when it absorbed some of the responsibilities of the former Department for Transport, Local Government and the Regions. The ODPM had responsibility for local and regional government, housing, communities and the fire service.

=== Environment, Transport and the Regions ===
==== Environment ====
The UK played a major role in the successful negotiations on the Kyoto Protocol on climate change and Prescott led the UK delegation at the discussions. In May 2006, in recognition of his work in delivering the Kyoto Treaty, Tony Blair asked him to work with the Foreign Secretary and the Environment Secretary on developing the Government's post-Kyoto agenda.

As minister on 24 August 1999, Prescott made regulations banning the use of chrysotile asbestos, which resulted in a complete ban on the use of any products containing asbestos in the United Kingdom from 24 November 1999.

==== Integrated transport policy ====
On coming to office, Prescott pursued an integrated public transport policy. On 6 June 1997, he said: "I will have failed if in five years time there are not...far fewer journeys by car. It's a tall order but I urge you to hold me to it." However, by June 2002, car traffic was up by 7%. This prompted Friends of the Earth's Tony Bosworth to say "By its own test, Government transport policy has failed".

Prescott successfully focussed attention on the role of car usage in the bigger environmental picture, and the need for effective public transport alternatives if car volume was to be reduced. The subsequent debate on road pricing evolved from his policy. A contrast was highlighted between Prescott's transport brief and an incident, in 1999, when an official chauffeur-driven car was used to transport Prescott and his wife 250 yards (230 m) from their hotel to the venue of the Labour Party Conference, where Prescott gave a speech on how to encourage the use of public transport. Prescott explained, "Because of the security reasons for one thing and second, my wife doesn't like to have her hair blown about. Have you got another silly question?" Prescott was fined for speeding on four occasions.

==== Rail regulation ====
Prescott had a stormy relationship with the privatisation of the railway industry. He had vigorously opposed the privatisation of the industry while the Labour Party was in opposition, and disliked the party's policy, established in 1996 just before the flotation of Railtrack on the London Stock Exchange, of committing to renationalise the industry only when resources allowed, which he saw as meaning that it would never be done. Reluctantly, he supported the alternative policy, produced by shadow transport secretary Clare Short, that the industry should be subjected to closer regulation by the to-be-created Strategic Rail Authority in the case of the passenger train operators, and the Rail Regulator in the case of the monopoly and dominant elements in the industry, principally Railtrack. The policy was spelled out in some detail in the Labour Party's statement in the June 1996 prospectus for the sale of Railtrack shares, and was widely regarded as having depressed the price of the shares.

In 1998, Prescott was criticised by Transport Minister John Reid for his statement – at the Labour Party conference that year – that the privatised railway was a "national disgrace", despite receiving a standing ovation from the Labour Party audience. The companies said that they had had some considerable successes in cutting costs and generating new revenues in the short time since their transfer to private sector hands, and that the criticisms were premature and unfair.

In that speech, Prescott also announced that he would be taking a far tougher line with the companies, and to that end he would be having a "spring clean" of the industry. In July 1998 Prescott published a transport White Paper stating that the rail industry needed an element of stability and certainty if it was to plan its activities effectively.

In February 1999, the regulation of the passenger rail operators fell to Sir Alastair Morton, (Note: Sir Alastair Morton left office, early, in October 2001. Tom Winsor continued until the end of his five-year term in July 2004.) who Prescott announced would be appointed as chairman of the Strategic Rail Authority, which would take over from the Director of Passenger Rail Franchising whose office would be wound up. In July 1999, the new Rail Regulator appointed by Prescott was Tom Winsor. They shared Prescott's view that the railway industry needed a considerable shake-up in its institutional, operational, engineering and economic matrix to attract and retain private investment and enable the companies within it to become strong, competent and successful.

=== Local and regional government ===
Prescott, responsible for local government, introduced a new system guiding members' conduct after 2001. The new system included a nationally agreed Code of Conduct laid down by statutory instrument which all local authorities were required to adopt; the Code of Conduct gives guidance on when councillors have an interest in a matter under discussion and when that interest is prejudicial so that the councillor may not speak or vote on the matter. Although on many areas councillors had previously been expected to withdraw where they had declared an interest, the new system was more formal and introduced specific sanctions for breaches; it was criticised for preventing councillors from representing the views of their local communities.

Prescott supported regional government in England. Early in his term, he introduced regional assemblies consisting of delegates from local authorities and other regional stakeholders to oversee the work of new Regional Development Agencies in the regions of England. Following Labour's second election victory, he pressed for the introduction of elected regional assemblies, which would have seen about 25 to 35 members elected under a similar electoral system to that used for the London Assembly. However, because of opposition, the government was forced to hold regional referendums on the change. The first three were intended to be in the North-East, North-West and Yorkshire and the Humber. The North-East referendum, where support was felt to be strongest, was first, in November 2004, but the vote was 78% against, an overwhelming margin, and the plan for elected regional assemblies was shelved.

=== Housing ===
A rising number of households (especially in the south-east) were putting added pressure on housing during Prescott's tenure as the minister responsible. An increase in the housebuilding was proposed, primarily on brownfield sites, but also on some undeveloped greenfield areas and as a result he was accused of undermining the Green Belt. During a radio interview in January 1998, Prescott was asked about housing development on the green belt; intending to convey that the government would enlarge green belt protection, Prescott replied: "It's a Labour achievement, and we mean to build on it". He had not intended to make a joke and was distressed when it prompted laughter.

In the north of England, Prescott approved the demolition of some 200,000 homes that were judged to be in "failing areas" as part of his Pathfinder regeneration scheme. It has been argued that renovating properties, rather than demolishing them, would have made better financial and community sense.

Prescott led the campaign to abolish council housing, which ran out of steam when tenants in Birmingham voted to stay with the council in 2002. A previous attempt to privatise all the council housing in the London Borough of Camden failed in 1997.

=== Opposition to education reforms ===
On 17 December 2005, Prescott made public his disapproval of Tony Blair's plans to give state schools the right to govern their finances and admission policies and to increase the number of city academies. It was the first policy stance that Prescott had made against Blair since his election as leader in 1994. Prescott said that the move would create a two-tier educational system that would discriminate against the working class. He added that Labour were "always better fighting class".

=== Links with the grass roots ===
Prescott, sometimes described as old-school trades unionist, kept in touch with the views of the traditional Labour voters throughout his career. He became an important figure in Tony Blair's "New Labour" movement, as the representative of 'old Labour' interests in the Shadow cabinet and subsequently around the Cabinet table as deputy prime minister.

However, now a member of the establishment, relationships with the grass roots were not always smooth. Whilst attending the Brit Awards in 1998, Chumbawamba member Danbert Nobacon poured a jug of iced water over Prescott, saying, "This is for the Liverpool Dockers". Dock workers in Liverpool had been involved in a two-year industrial dispute: a strike that had turned into a lock-out, until a few weeks earlier. A reporter from the Daily Mirror threw water over Nobacon the following day.

=== Abolition of department ===
In a Cabinet reshuffle on 5 May 2006, Prescott's departmental responsibilities were transferred to Ruth Kelly, as Secretary of State for Communities and Local Government, following revelations about his private life and a poor performance by Labour in that year's local elections. He remained as deputy prime minister, with a seat in the Cabinet, and was given a role as a special envoy to the Far East as well as additional responsibilities chairing cabinet committees. Despite having lost his departmental responsibilities it was announced that he would retain his full salary (£134,000pa) and pension entitlements, along with both his grace-and-favour homes, an announcement which received considerable criticism.

The press speculated in July 2006 that, as a consequence of the continuing problems centred on Prescott, Blair was preparing to replace him as deputy prime minister with David Miliband, whilst possibly retaining Prescott as Deputy Leader of the Labour Party.

=== Announcement of retirement ===
In a speech to the 2006 Labour Party Conference in Manchester, Prescott apologised for the bad press he had caused the party during the previous year. He said: "I know in the last year I let myself down, I let you down. So Conference, I just want to say sorry", and confirmed that he would stand down as deputy leader when Blair resigned the premiership. Prescott subsequently announced in the House of Commons that he was "... in a rather happy demob stage", in January 2007.

Within 30 minutes of Blair announcing the date of his resignation on 10 May 2007, Prescott announced his resignation as Deputy Leader of the Labour Party. During the subsequent special Labour Party Conference, Gordon Brown was elected Leader and Harriet Harman succeeded Prescott as Deputy Leader.

== Life after government ==
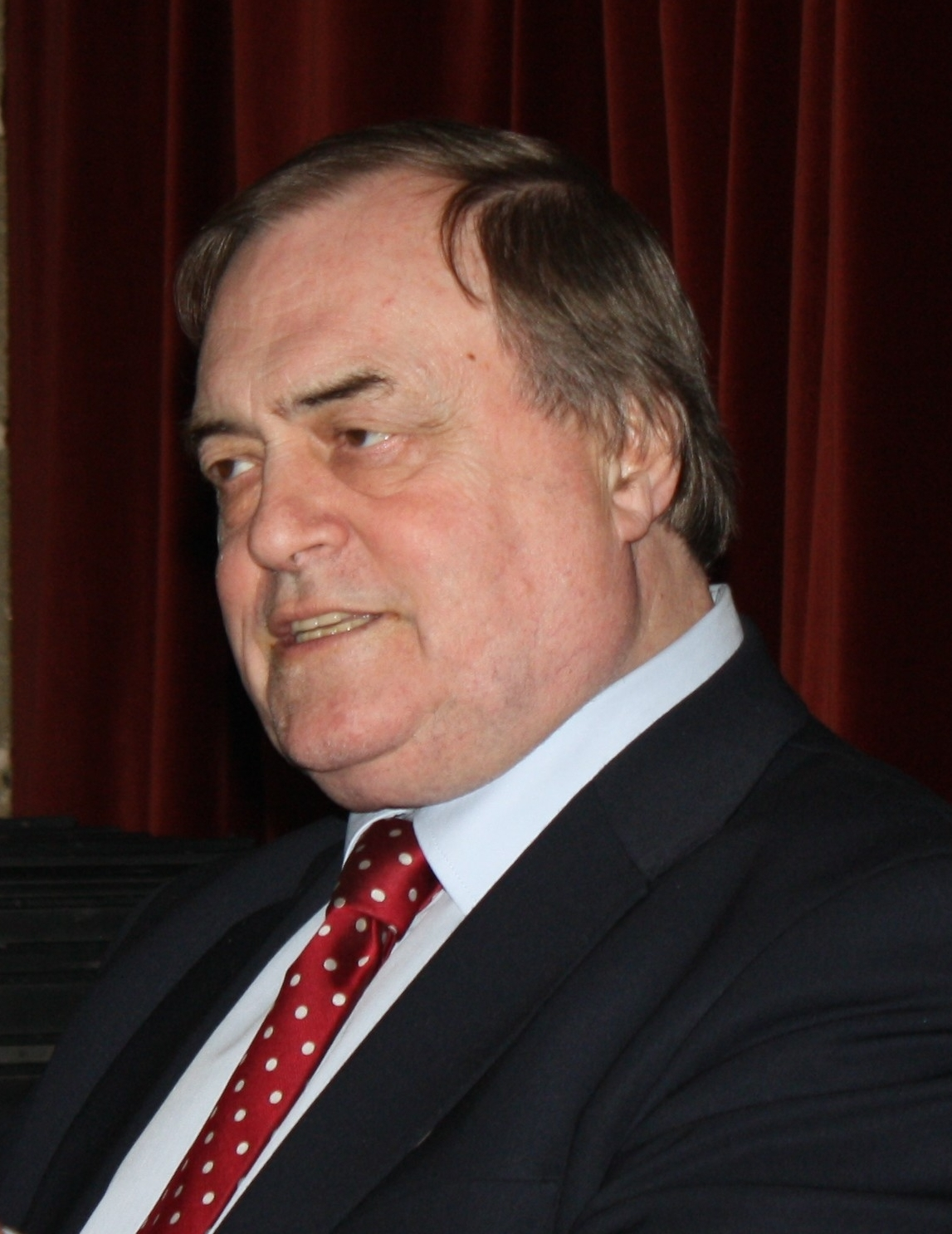
Prescott in 2009

Following his resignation from the government, Prescott took over from Tony Lloyd as the lead UK representative in the Parliamentary Assembly of the Council of Europe. In a jocular response to the appointment, Shadow Europe Minister Mark Francois wished the translators good luck. The post was unpaid but had an expenses allowance and allowed him to sit on the Assembly of the Western European Union. He used his role on the council to make his campaign against slave labour a key issue.

Prescott stood down as an MP at the next general election. His autobiography, Prezza, My Story: Pulling no Punches was published on 29 May 2008 and ghostwritten by Hunter Davies. During the 2010 general election campaign, Prescott toured the UK in a customised white transit van dubbed his "Battlebus" canvassing support for the Labour Party. Prescott was publicly very supportive of Gordon Brown, and called him a "global giant".

It was announced on 28 May 2010 that Prescott was to be awarded a life peerage, The peerage was gazetted on 15 June in the 2010 Dissolution Honours. He was introduced into the House on 8 July as Baron Prescott, of Kingston upon Hull in the County of East Yorkshire, and the Letters patent were gazetted on 12 July, dated 7 July.

Prescott was a director of Super League rugby league club Hull Kingston Rovers, who are based in his former constituency of Kingston upon Hull East. Prescott stood for the position of Labour Party Treasurer in September 2010 but was defeated by Diana Holland, who took 68.96% of the total vote.

On 30 July 2010, Prescott appeared before the panel at the Chilcot Inquiry concerning the Iraq War. Prescott stated that he was doubtful about the legality, intelligence and information about Iraq's Weapons of Mass Destruction. The inquiry was launched by Gordon Brown in the summer of 2009 shortly after operations in the war ended. In 2016, after publication of the resultant Chilcot Report, which was critical of the war but remained neutral on its legality, Prescott declared that the invasion by UK and US forces had been "illegal" and that members of Tony Blair's Cabinet "were given too little paper documentation to make decisions".

In February 2012, Prescott announced he would stand for Labour's nomination in the election to be the first Police and crime commissioner for Humberside Police. In June he was selected as the Labour candidate for the election in November 2012. In the November election Prescott won the most first preference votes but ended up losing to Conservative Matthew Grove in the second count.

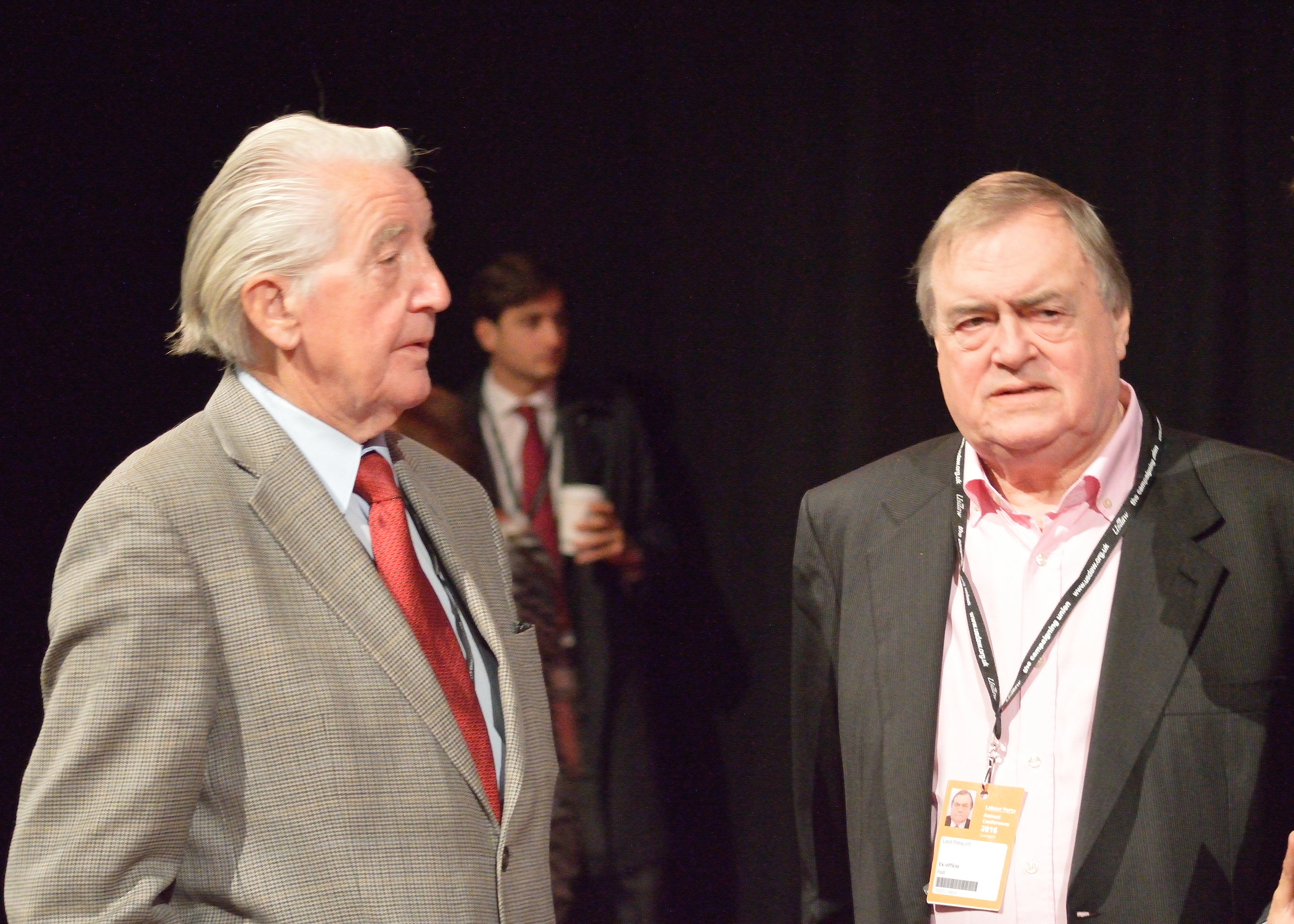
Dennis Skinner and Prescott at the 2016 Labour Party Conference

In March 2013, Prescott suggested that the Queen, Elizabeth II, should abdicate due to her health. Prescott was criticised for his position by several MPs.

On 6 July 2013, Prescott revealed in a newspaper column that he had resigned from the Privy Council in protest against the delays to the introduction of press regulation. The resignation only became effective on 6 November the same year. The Coalition Government had insisted that the Privy Council must consider a cross-party Royal Charter to underpin a new system of regulation, but that this meant that a final decision would not be taken before 2015.

On 21 February 2015, it was announced Prescott would return to politics as an adviser to Labour leader Ed Miliband. This was a brief return, as Labour lost the imminent general election.

In October 2015, Prescott was presented with the Shechtman International Leadership Award at the Sustainable Industrial Processing Summit 2015 in Antalya, Turkey, for his contributions to sustainable development in politics.

Prescott ceased to be a member of the House of Lords on 9 July 2024 under the House of Lords Reform Act 2014 because of non-attendance in the preceding session of Parliament. He retained his peerage.

=== Television appearances ===
In June 2008, Prescott made a cameo appearance, playing a policeman, in the BBC Radio 4 adaptation of Robert Tressell's The Ragged-Trousered Philanthropists. In 2009, he made a brief cameo appearance as himself in the final episode of the BBC Three comedy series Gavin & Stacey (this referred to a running joke in the show regarding a relationship the character Nessa had had with him many years previously). Beginning on 7 January 2011, Prescott appeared in a TV advert for price comparison website moneysupermarket.com, along with comedian Omid Djalili, which gently mocks events in his political career. On 27 February 2011, he appeared on the BBC's Top Gear as the "Star in the Reasonably Priced Car", where he set a lap time of 1.56.7, the second-slowest lap in a Kia Ceed. (Note: Prescott's lap was made in very wet conditions. The slowest lap time, made by Damian Lewis, was in heavy snow, which made the lap time much slower (2:09.1, about 12 seconds slower than Prescott's).) He also engaged in a discussion with host Jeremy Clarkson regarding his time in Government.

In October and November 2008, Prescott was the subject of a two-part documentary, Prescott: the Class System and Me, on BBC Two, looking at the class system in Britain, and asking whether it still exists. In 2009, he featured in the BBC Wales TV series Coming Home about his Welsh family history, with roots in Prestatyn and Chirk. In October 2009, he was featured in another BBC Two documentary, Prescott: The North/South Divide, in which he and his wife Pauline explored the current state of the North-South Divide from their perspective as Northern Englanders long used to living in the south of the country.

In April 2015, Prescott appeared as a guest on the television panel show Have I Got News For You. During the episode he had a "pretty heated" interaction with team captain Ian Hislop.

In 2019, Prescott hosted the television series Made in Yorkshire (also known as Made in Britain: Yorkshire) for Channel 5, in which he explored the manufacturing of some of Britain's favourite foods.

== Public profile ==
Prescott gained a reputation in the press for confused speech, mangled syntax and poor grammar. The Guardian columnist Simon Hoggart once commented: "Every time Prescott opens his mouth, it's like someone has flipped open his head and stuck in an egg whisk." An oft-quoted but unverified story in Jeremy Paxman's The Political Animal is that, before being accepted as transcribers to the Parliamentary record Hansard, applicants must listen to one of Prescott's speeches and write down what they think he was trying to say. However, Liz Davies wrote that on the Labour National Executive Committee, Prescott "spoke in clear, concise sentences and his point was always understandable. Contrary to his television and parliamentary image, he appears to choose his words with care."

The media attached various sobriquets to Prescott during his political career. Originally, Prescott's nickname was "Prezza", but as various misfortunes befell him, the sobriquets became more colourful, leading to "Two Jags", which set the template for later nicknames. Prescott owned one Jaguar, and had the use of another as his official ministerial car. A later version of this term was "Two Jabs", following his retaliation against a protester farmer in 2001, and "Two Shacks", referring to his former country house. When he lost his department in a cabinet reshuffle following exposure of his affair, newspapers dubbed him "Two Shags" and "No Jobs". Banned from driving after being convicted of speeding in 1991, Prescott was banned again after a similar conviction in June 2015. Motoring enthusiast and frontman for Jamiroquai, Jay Kay, himself known for speeding violations, said in a 2000 TV interview that Prescott had "about as much class as a British Rail sandwich".

=== "Prescott punch" ===
During the 2001 election campaign, Prescott was campaigning in Rhyl, Denbighshire, when Craig Evans threw an egg at him. Prescott, a former amateur boxer, responded immediately with a left jab punch to the jaw. The incident, overshadowing the launch of the Labour Party manifesto on that day, was captured by television cameras. Tony Blair responded by stating: "John is John". A National Opinion Polls (NOP) survey found that the incident did no public harm to Prescott, and may even have benefited his standing amongst male voters. Speaking on Top Gear, Prescott stated: "I was against fox-hunting, and he thought I was one of the guys he hated because I wanted to keep fox-hunting". He elaborated:

When I walked past this guy, and he hit me with the egg, right, I don't know it was an egg, I just feel this very warm thing running down my neck and I think, well I just think somebody's perhaps knifed me or assaulted me, you know, that all happens in a split second, and I see this fellow built like a bloody barn door, and I turned, and I reacted, and when Tony [Blair] asked me, er, what happened I said I was carrying out his orders; he told us to connect with the electorate, so I did.

— John Prescott

This incident earned Prescott the nickname "Two Jabs", a reference to his existing nickname, "Two Jags".

=== Council tax ===
In 2003, Prescott gave up a home that he had rented from the RMT Union in Clapham; he had left the union in June 2002. Prescott paid £220 a month for the property – a fifth of its market value. Though he had not declared the flat in the register of members' interests, he was subsequently exonerated by MPs who overruled Elizabeth Filkin, the Parliamentary Commissioner for Standards. On 12 January 2006, Prescott apologised after it was revealed that the council tax for the government flat he occupied at Admiralty House was paid from public money, rather than his private income. He repaid the amount, which came to £3,830.52 over nearly nine years.

=== Sexual infidelity ===
Prescott came under fire for additional controversies over sexual infidelity. On 26 April 2006, he admitted to having had an affair with his diary secretary, Tracey Temple, between 2002 and 2004. This two-year affair was said to have commenced after an office party and, in part, took place during meetings at Prescott's grace-and-favour flat in Whitehall. Conservative MP Andrew Robathan tabled questions in the House of Commons over Prescott's reported entertainment of Temple at Dorneywood, his official residence, which raised questions over the possible misuse of public finances.

=== Sexual assault allegation ===
On 7 May 2006, The Sunday Times quoted Linda McDougall, wife of Austin Mitchell, as saying that in 1978 Prescott had pushed her "quite forcefully" against a wall and put his hand up her skirt as she opened the door for him to a meeting in her own house just after her husband became an MP.

=== Expenses claims ===
On 8 May 2009, The Daily Telegraph began publishing leaked details of MPs' expenses. The Telegraph reported that Prescott had claimed £312 for fitting mock Tudor beams to his constituency home, and for two new toilet seats in as many years. Prescott responded by saying, "Every expense was within the rules of the House of Commons on claiming expenses at the time".

=== Other incidents ===
Prescott was criticised for maintaining the benefits of deputy prime minister despite losing his department in 2006. He was criticised for visiting the American billionaire Phil Anschutz, who was bidding for the government licence to build a super casino in the UK, and questioned over his involvement in the business of his son Johnathan Prescott. He was photographed playing croquet at Dorneywood, his then "grace and favour" home, when Tony Blair was out of the country on a visit to Washington. Prescott was mocked in the media – in part because the game was so divorced from his working-class roots – and he gave up the use of the house. He later said that it had been his staff's idea to play croquet and that contrary to press reports, he had not been acting prime minister when he had played the game.

== Personal life, illness and death ==
Prescott married Pauline Tilston in 1961. They had two sons. Their younger son, David Prescott, was active in Labour Party politics and worked in the office of former party leader Jeremy Corbyn; he failed to be selected for his father's parliamentary seat in Hull but was the Labour candidate for Gainsborough in 2015. In October 2025, David joined the Green Party. Tilston had already had a son by an American airman in the 1950s, whom she gave up for adoption. In an episode of Desert Island Discs broadcast in February 2012, Prescott said he acknowledged Pauline's first son as part of his family, a third son.

Prescott disclosed in 2002 that he had been diagnosed with type 2 diabetes in 1990. He was briefly hospitalised in June 2007, diagnosed with pneumonia, and treated at University College Hospital, London. In 2008, Prescott recounted having suffered from the eating disorder bulimia nervosa, which he believed was brought on by stress, from the 1980s until 2007. Prescott was admitted to Hull Royal Infirmary in June 2019 after a stroke. He subsequently returned to his duties, but spoke in the House of Lords on only one subsequent occasion and last voted in February 2023. He ceased to be a member of the House of Lords in July 2024 owing to non-attendance.

Prescott died on 20 November 2024, aged 86; his family said that he had been living in a care home with Alzheimer's disease. Blair and Brown paid tribute, along with incumbent prime minister Keir Starmer and the deputy prime minister Angela Rayner. His funeral took place in Hull Minster on 30 January 2025.

== Publications ==
- Prescott, John (2008). Prezza: My Story: Pulling No Punches. London: Headline Review. ISBN 978-0-7553-1775-2. OCLC 212431550.

== Notes ==
Parliament of the United Kingdom
Preceded by Harry Pursey	Member of Parliament for Kingston upon Hull East; 1970–2010	Succeeded by Karl Turner
Political offices
Preceded by Albert Booth	Shadow Secretary of State for Transport; 1983–1984	Succeeded by Gwyneth Dunwoody
Preceded by John Smith	Shadow Secretary of State for Employment; 1984–1987	Succeeded by Michael Meacher
Preceded by Stan Orme	Shadow Secretary of State for Energy; 1987–1988	Succeeded by Tony Blair
Preceded by Robert Hughes	Shadow Secretary of State for Transport; 1988–1993	Succeeded by Frank Dobson
Preceded by Frank Dobson	Shadow Secretary of State for Employment; 1993–1994	Succeeded by Harriet Harman
Preceded by John Gummer as Secretary of State for the Environment	Secretary of State for the Environment, Transport and the Regions; 1997–2001	Succeeded by Margaret Beckett as Secretary of State for Environment, Food and Rural Affairs
Preceded by George Young as Secretary of State for Transport	Secretary of State for the Environment, Transport and the Regions; 1997–2001	Succeeded by Stephen Byers as Secretary of State for Transport, Local Government and the Regions
Preceded by Michael Heseltine	Deputy Prime Minister of the United Kingdom; 1997–2007	Vacant Title next held by Nick Clegg
Vacant Title last held by Michael Heseltine	First Secretary of State; 2001–2007	Vacant Title next held by Peter Mandelson
Party political offices
Preceded by Michael Stewart	Leader of the European Parliamentary Labour Party; 1976–1979	Succeeded by Barbara Castle
Preceded by Margaret Beckett	Deputy Leader of the Labour Party; 1994–2007	Succeeded by Harriet Harman
