= Joseph Firbank =

- Born: c. 1819; Bishop Auckland, England
- Died: 29 June 1886

Joseph Firbank (c. 1819 – 29 June 1886) was an English railway contractor.

== Early life ==
Joseph Firbank was born at Bishop Auckland in about 1819, the son of a Durham miner. At the age of seven he was sent to work in a colliery, but he attended a night-school.

== Industrial career ==
In 1841 Firbank secured a sub-contract in connection with the Woodhead tunnel on the Stockton and Darlington railway, and in 1845 and 1846 he took contracts on the Midland railway. The opposition to railway construction was so great at this time that on one occasion Firbank was captured and kept a prisoner for twenty-four hours. Several landowners would not permit contractors or their workmen to approach their demesnes.

In 1848, Firbank was engaged on the Rugby and Stamford branch of the North-Western railway, and he lost most of his savings by the bankruptcy of the former contractor of the line.

When the Monmouthshire Railway and Canal Company transformed their mineral tramways and canals into passenger railways in 1854, Firbank took the contract for dealing with the canals in the town of Newport, Monmouthshire. He also took the contract for the maintenance of the lines for seven years, and this contract was several times renewed. Firbank established himself at Newport, where he formed an intimate friendship with Crawshay Bailey, the ironmaster, who supported him in his early undertakings. He was employed in South Wales for thirty years, until the absorption of the Monmouthshire company by the Great Western Railway.

In 1856, Firbank took a contract for the widening of the London and North-Western railway near London and afterwards (1859–66) various contracts on the Brighton line. He was also engaged upon the Midland Company's Bedford and London extension (1864–1868), which involved great difficulties and ultimately cost the company upwards of £3,000,000. He was contractor in 1870 on the Settle and Carlisle extension of the Midland railway. He was afterwards contractor for many lines, the most difficult undertaking being the Birmingham west suburban section of the Midland railway. In 1884 he built the St. Pancras goods depôt of the Midland railway.

The last contract taken by him was for the Bournemouth direct line from Brockenhurst to Christchurch. It proved to be the most troublesome of all his undertakings, and was finally completed by his son, Joseph T. Firbank. The lines constructed by Firbank from 1846 to 1886 amounted to forty-nine. All through his career he was a generous employer, doing his best to promote the welfare of those whom he employed.

== Public service ==
Firbank became a justice of the peace and deputy-lieutenant for the county of Monmouth, and in 1885 High Sheriff of Monmouthshire.

== Death ==
Firbank died at his home, near Newport, on 29 June 1886.

== Assessment ==
Firbank has been described as "an excellent specimen of the Englishmen who rise up not so much by any transcendent talents, as by intelligence and energy", and above all by a scrupulous "honesty, inspiring confidence". He was indefatigable in work, retiring to rest by nine o'clock and rarely rising later than five. His business faculties were very great.

Firbank was married three times and was survived by his third wife and seven children. One of his sons, born to his second wife, Sarah Fryatt Black, (Joseph) Thomas Firbank, became a Member of Parliament (1885–1906), was knighted in 1902 and was the father of the novelist, Ronald Firbank (b. 1886)
