= The Justice Gap =

UK magazine about law and justice

The Justice Gap is an online UK-based magazine "about the law and justice and the difference between the two". The magazine was set up in 2011 by Jon Robins, a journalist and a lecturer in criminology at Brighton University, who remains its editor. Robins is also the author of books including The Justice Gap: Whatever Happened to Legal Aid? (Legal Action Group, 2008; with Steve Hynes), Guilty Until Proven Innocent: The Crisis in Our Justice System (Biteback Publishing, 2018) and Justice in a Time of Austerity (Bristol University Press, 2021; with Dan Newman).

In collaboration with four universities – Cardiff University, Glasgow University, Manchester University and University College London – The Justice Gap runs a news reporting scheme that is open to students with an interest in journalism and who have a commitment to human rights. An aim of The Justice Gap is to broaden the discussion about law and justice, and to feature voices and perspectives not normally heard in the debate.

The Justice Gap produces a print magazine called Proof, which has had contributions from professionals including Helena Kennedy QC, Martha Spurrier, Lord Tony Gifford, David Conn, and others.

Among contributors to The Justice Gap have been leading campaigning lawyers, such as Michael Mansfield QC, prominent journalists who include Ian Cobain, Bob Woffinden and David Jessel, as well as academics and other high-profile commentators. The site has also run interviews with leading members of the legal profession (for example, former Court of Appeal judge Henry Brooke, David Runciman of the Royal Commission on Criminal Justice, and Michael Zander QC); with politicians including former Lord Chancellor Charlie Falconer; with London mayor Sadiq Khan; with campaigners Paddy Hill, Peter Tatchell and advocacy group Liberty's Shami Chakrabarti and Martha Spurrier; as well as with film producers Jimmy McGovern and Ken Loach, and broadcaster Paul Gambaccini.
