= Ronald Kidd =

British civil rights campaigner

Ronald Hubert Kidd (11 July 1889 – 13 May 1942) was a British civil rights campaigner.

Portrait of Ronald Kidd in 1940 by photographer Howard Coster

== Life ==
He was born in London, England, the son of surgeon Leonard Joseph Kidd, grandson of doctor Joseph Kidd, and nephew of doctors Percy Kidd and Walter Aubrey Kidd; his mother was Alice Maud Peek. Kidd studied science at University College, London, but took no degree. He had a variety of jobs before finding his vocation as a campaigner against injustices in 1930s and 1940s Britain.

In 1934, angered by Police responses to hunger marchers, he founded the Council for Civil Liberties (later the National Council for Civil Liberties (NCCL) and now known as Liberty), with Sylvia Crowther-Smith. It included E. M. Forster as its president, and Clement Attlee, Aneurin Bevan, Havelock Ellis, Aldous Huxley, J. B. Priestley, Bertrand Russell, and H. G. Wells among its vice-presidents. An early campaign against what became the Incitement to Disaffection Act 1934 saw Kidd promote some effective amendments of the bill, supported by William Searle Holdsworth.

Kidd continued to administer the council's affairs, despite serious illness, until his death in 1942.

Forster's funeral oration to Kidd was included in his collection of essays, Two Cheers for Democracy, and concludes with the description:

[T]here was in our friend something of the Ancient Roman, the Tribune of the People, who contents that the Res Publica should be the possession of all [...] There is here something that suggests the grandeur and the sternness of certain heroes of the ancient world, and their strife for an individual liberty compatible with civic righteousness. May his example remain with us! May we continue the fight that is never done!

— E M Forster, Two Cheers for Democracy

== Sources ==
- Sylvia Scaffardi, Fire Under the Carpet: Working for Civil Liberties in the 1930s (London, 1986)
