= Shahram =

Shahram (Persian: شهرام) is a masculine Persian given name.

The name is made of two parts, 'shah' meaning king and 'raam'. "raam" has two potential meaning in Old Persian and Zoroastrianin : as the angel of benevolent or shortened version of Rama (Supreme Being)

== List of notable people with the given name Shahram ==
- Shahram Amiri (1978–2016), Iranian nuclear scientist
- Shahrum Kashani (1974–2021), Iranian singer
- Shahram Mahmoudi (born 1988), Iranian volleyball player
- Shahram Nazeri (born 1950), Iranian singer
- Shahram Rostami (born 1948), Iranian fighter pilot
- Shahram Shabpareh (born 1948), Iranian singer
- Shahram Taghavi, barrister in the United Kingdom
