= Taghavi =

Taghavi or Taqavi (Persian: تقوی) related to the Arabic and Persian term تقوا with the meaning of piety or virtue, is a Persian surname which in both of its Latin transcriptions (Taghavi and Taqavi) of the Perso-Arabic alphabet is also common among the Iranian diaspora.

Notable people with the surname include:

- Ahmad Taghavi (born 1978), Iranian footballer
- Hamid Taqavi (1955–2014), Brigadier General in the Iranian Army of the Guardians of the Islamic Revolution
- Mehdi Taghavi (born 1987), Iranian wrestler
- Mohammad Taghavi (born 1967), retired Iranian football player
- Mojtaba Taghavi (born 1968), retired Iranian football player
- Shahram Taghavi, English lawyer
