= Caoilfhionn Gallagher =

Irish human rights lawyer based in London

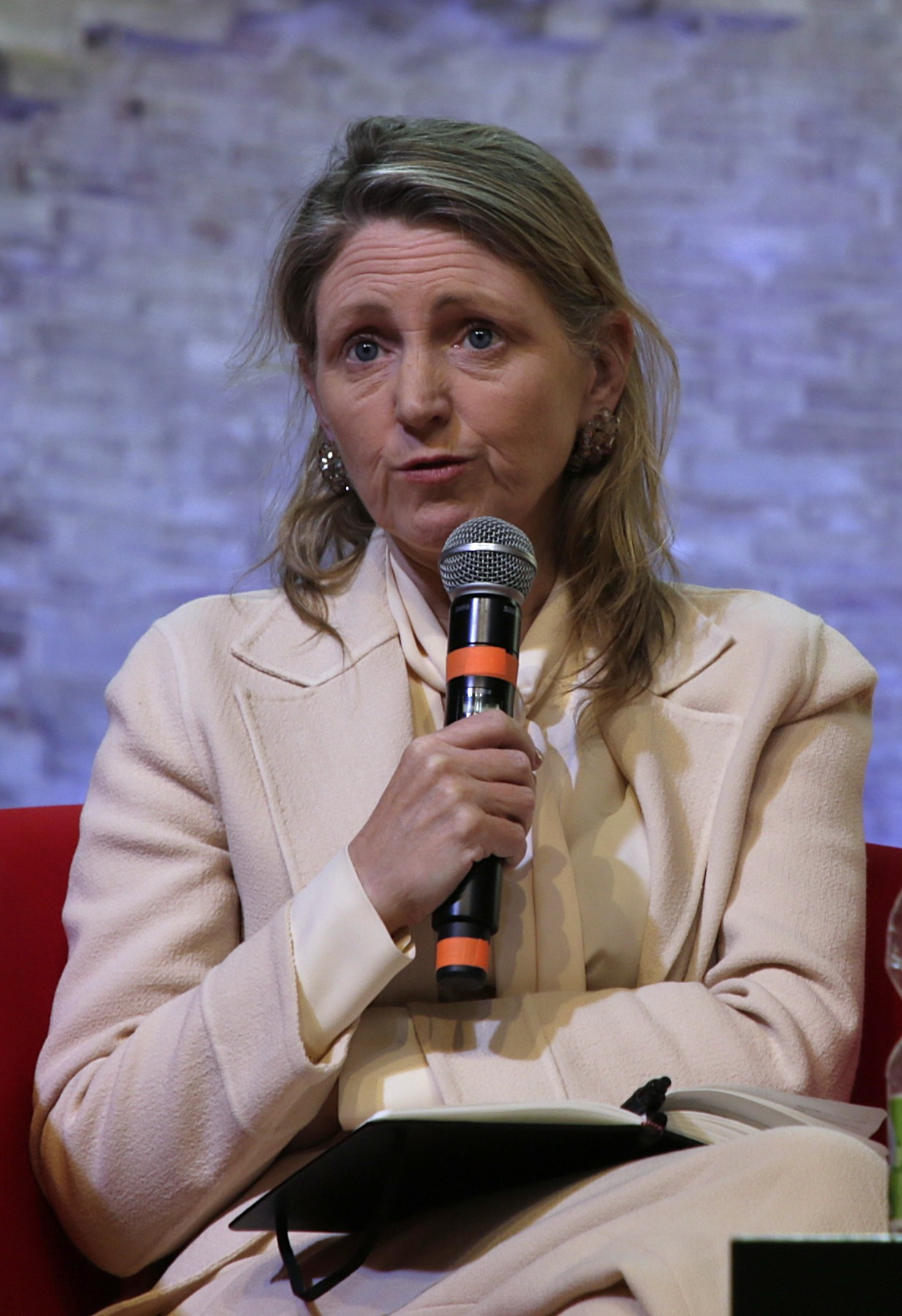
- Gallagher at the International Journalism Festival in 2026
- Born: Dublin
- Education: University College Dublin
- Occupation: lawyer
- Known for: expertise in human rights and civil liberties

Caoilfhionn Gallagher KC is an Irish barrister, specialising in human rights and civil liberties. Until March 2026, she was an asociate tenant at Doughty Street Chambers in London.

== Life ==
Gallagher studied at University College Dublin and graduated in 1999 with a Bachelor's degree in Civil Law. She also holds degrees from the Honorable Society of the King's Inns, Dublin; and Cambridge University.

She is one of the three joint founders of the ‘Act for the Act’ campaign (with Martha Spurrier and Fiona Bawdon), a crowdfunded advertising campaign to tell positive stories about the Human Rights Act 1998.

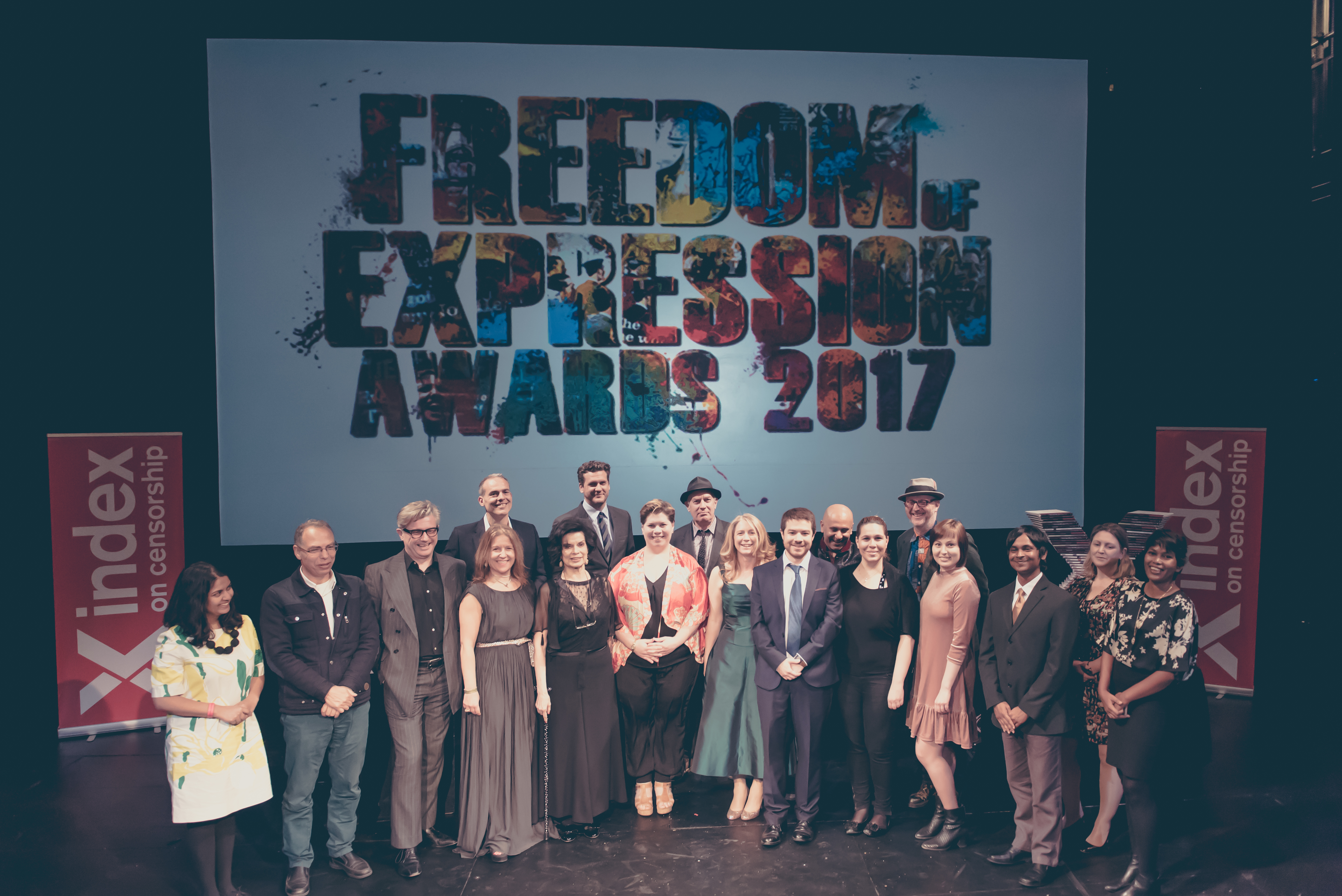
At the 2017 Freedom of Expression Awards (2nd from right)

Gallagher led the lawyers working for the release of Ibrahim Halawa, an Irish citizen from Firhouse in South Dublin who was imprisoned in Egypt between 2013 and 2017. and who was adopted by Amnesty International as a prisoner of conscience.

She has represented survivors of the Hillsborough disaster and the 7/7 bombings.

In 2017, she received UCD's alumni award in Law and she became a Queen's Counsel in the same year. Gallagher also served as a judge that year at the Freedom of Expression Awards with actor Noma Dumezweni, Tina Brown, Anab Jain and Stephen Budd.

In 2022, she spoke out against what she saw as anti-Irish and anti-lawyer talk made by British government ministers. She thought these were a result of Brexit. She had personally received death threats and Amnesty International supported her view that politicians should be more cautious in their accusations against lawyers and judges.

In 2023, she was appointed to a three-year term as the Irish Special Rapporteur for Children, replacing Prof. Conor O'Mahony. During her time in the role, there were delays in the provision of "key" annual reports, with all three reports submitted in early 2026.
