= Doughty Street Chambers =

British barristers located in Manchester and London

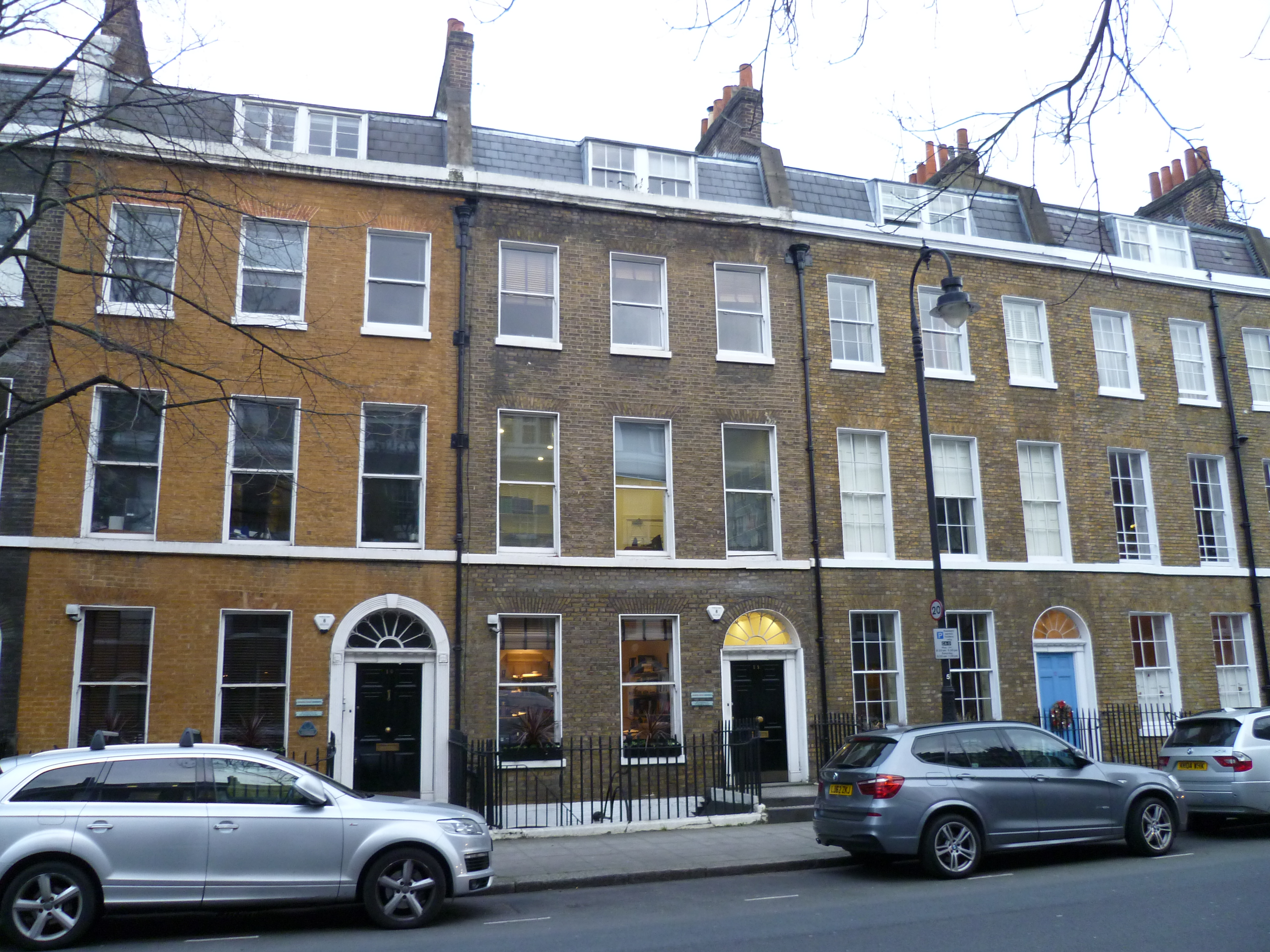
Doughty Street Chambers

Doughty Street Chambers is a British set of barristers' chambers situated in Bristol, Manchester and London's Doughty Street, undertaking criminal justice, public law, immigration, employment, human rights and civil liberties work.

Doughty Street Chambers was set up in 1990 by thirty barristers, aiming to break the mould of traditional chambers by moving out of the Inns of Court. The chambers are now over four times the size with over 120 members, including 42 King's Counsels. Geoffrey Robertson KC was the founding head of Doughty Street Chambers.

Helena Normanton's nomination for an English Heritage Blue Plaque (unveiled in October 2021 by Brenda Hale) was made by women barristers at Doughty Street Chambers.

Due to representing Hong Kong pro-democracy activist and media owner Jimmy Lai, barristers have been targeted by the Chinese state with rape threats to themselves and their children, surveillance and hacking of bank accounts.

== Notable members ==
- Kirsty Brimelow
- Amal Clooney – human rights lawyer, married to actor George Clooney
- Edward Fitzgerald – founding head of chambers
- Caoilfhionn Gallagher – international expert in human rights, currently leading Jimmy Lai's international legal defense team
- Sadakat Kadri – also an author and journalist
- Helena Kennedy – member of the House of Lords
- Max du Plessis
- Geoffrey Robertson – founding head of chambers
- Jennifer Robinson – best known for her role as a long-standing member of the legal team defending Julian Assange and WikiLeaks
- Martha Spurrier – director of the advocacy group Liberty
- Keir Starmer – former Prime Minister of the United Kingdom
- Shahram Taghavi
- Geraldine Van Bueren
- Adam Wagner
