= Elizabeth A. Allen =

British social activist (born 1901)

Elizabeth Acland Allen
- Born: 1901
- Died: 1969 (aged 67–68)
- Occupation: Social Activist
- Years active: 1930s–1960s
- Organisations: National Council for Civil Liberties (NCCL); British Committee for Refugees from Czechoslovakia; Women's Liberal Federation; Women's International Democratic Federation; International Alliance of Women
- Known for: Serving as General Secretary of the National Council for Civil Liberties; Activism in women's, liberal, and civil liberties organisations
- Parent: Arthur Acland Allen (father)

Elizabeth Acland Allen (1901–1969) was a British social activist of the 20th century involved in a number of women's, liberal and civil liberties organisations.

Elizabeth Allen was the eldest of three daughters of Arthur Acland Allen, a British Liberal Party politician who served as a member of parliament (MP) between 1906 and 1918.

Allen is recorded as having been employed in the 1930s as a secretary of Rosa Manus, a Dutch activist involved in a number of women's organisations. In 1939, she acted as secretary of the visa committee of the British Committee for Refugees from Czechoslovakia, an organisation established in 1938 after the Munich Agreement, which enabled the occupation of Czechoslovakia and precipitated an exodus of refugees from the Sudetenland.

Allen became the General Secretary of the (UK) National Council for Civil Liberties (NCCL) in 1942, serving until 1960; she was the only women of the time to lead a large advocacy organisation. UK security services worked on the presumption that there was a nexus between the NCCL and the Communist Party of Great Britain on the basis that a number of people involved in NCCL were fellow travellers of that party. The Metropolitan Police Special Branch took the view that Allen's accession to the General Secretary role brought the organisation ‘more firmly than ever under Communist Party control’. The NCCL under Allen has been described as dreary, very stagnant, and her leadership described as timid. A number of previous supporters had left the organisation and it was perceived to have a reduced status, and to have lost the glamour of its early years. In the early 1940s, it expanded its anti-fascist work. Later in her term, its priorities shifted towards the provision of information and guidance on existing rights and towards a social service function. One area of concentration was on the rights of mentally ill people confined to institutions, which informed a Royal Commission on mental health provision, which in turn led to the Mental Health Act 1959.

Allen was vice-president of the Women's Liberal Federation, a member of the British International Women's Day Committee, and according to Francisca de Haan, one of the most prominent women involved in establishing the Women's International Democratic Federation in 1945, and the keynote speaker on women's rights at the November 1945 WIDF Paris congress.

She was also, in 1945, a member of the International Alliance of Women’s International Committee. She is recorded in 1945 as having compiled a report on a 10-day visit to northern France for the IAW.

Two of Allen's works in connection with the NCCL are recorded in the archives of Sylvia Scaffardi at Hull History Centre:

- The first year’s work (draft, 1935)
- Local government and civil liberty (pamphlet, 1945)

Other works include:

- It shall not happen here : anti-Semitism, Fascists and Civil liberty (1943)
