= Joseph Kidd =

Irish doctor

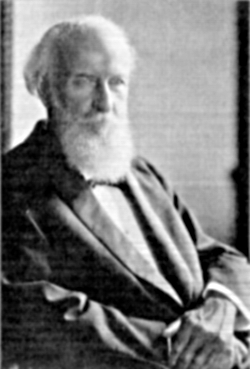
Photographic portrait, a family photograph (c. 1890)

Joseph Kidd (15 February 1824 – 20 August 1918) was an Irish doctor, author, and physician to Benjamin Disraeli.

== Biography ==
Joseph Kidd was born in Limerick, Ireland, on 15 February 1824, one of at least fifteen children of Thomas Keane Kidd, a merchant. After medical training locally and in Dublin he moved to London to join the Homoeopathic Hospital, and then almost immediately returned to Ireland to help victims of the Great Famine. Returning to London he left the Homeopathic Hospital, stopped prescribing homeopathic treatments, and established successful practices in Blackheath and the City of London. In 1850 he married Sophia McKern, a childhood friend, with whom he had eight children, including Percy Marmaduke Kidd, the eldest. Sophia died in 1872, and in 1875 Kidd married Frances Octavia Rouse, with whom he had another seven children. He continued working until 1912, when he was nearly 90 years old and died aged 94 on 20 August 1918, in Hastings, Sussex.

== Family ==
- Percy Kidd (1851–1942), doctor, his son.
- Walter Aubrey Kidd FRSE (1853–1929) doctor and author, his son
- Eric Leslie Kidd (1889–1984), cricketer, director of Guinness Ltd, his grandson.
- Ronald Kidd (1889–1942), co-founder and director of The National Council for Civil Liberties (now called Liberty) his grandson
- Dorothy McCall, his daughter

== Works ==
Among his published writings are:

- Homaeopathy in Acute Diseases: Narrative of a Mission to Ireland During the Famine of 1847 (London, 1849)
- Practical observations on diphtheria, with cases (Manchester, 1859)
- Directions for the Homaeopathic Treatment of Cholera (London, 1866)
- The laws of Therapeutics, a Sketch (London, 1878)
- "The inheritance of Bright's disease of the kidney", The Practitioner, vol 29 p 170 (1882)
- "The Last Illness of Lord Beaconsfield", Nineteenth Century: A Monthly Review, vol 26 (1889)
- Heart Disease and the Nauheim Treatment (London, 1897)
- Heart Disease and the Nauheim Treatment, With a New Chapter, 2nd ed. (London, 1898)
- "The Engadine - summer and winter. An account of its lifestyle, its people, etc.", in Nineteenth Century (1888)
