= Eric Leslie Kidd =

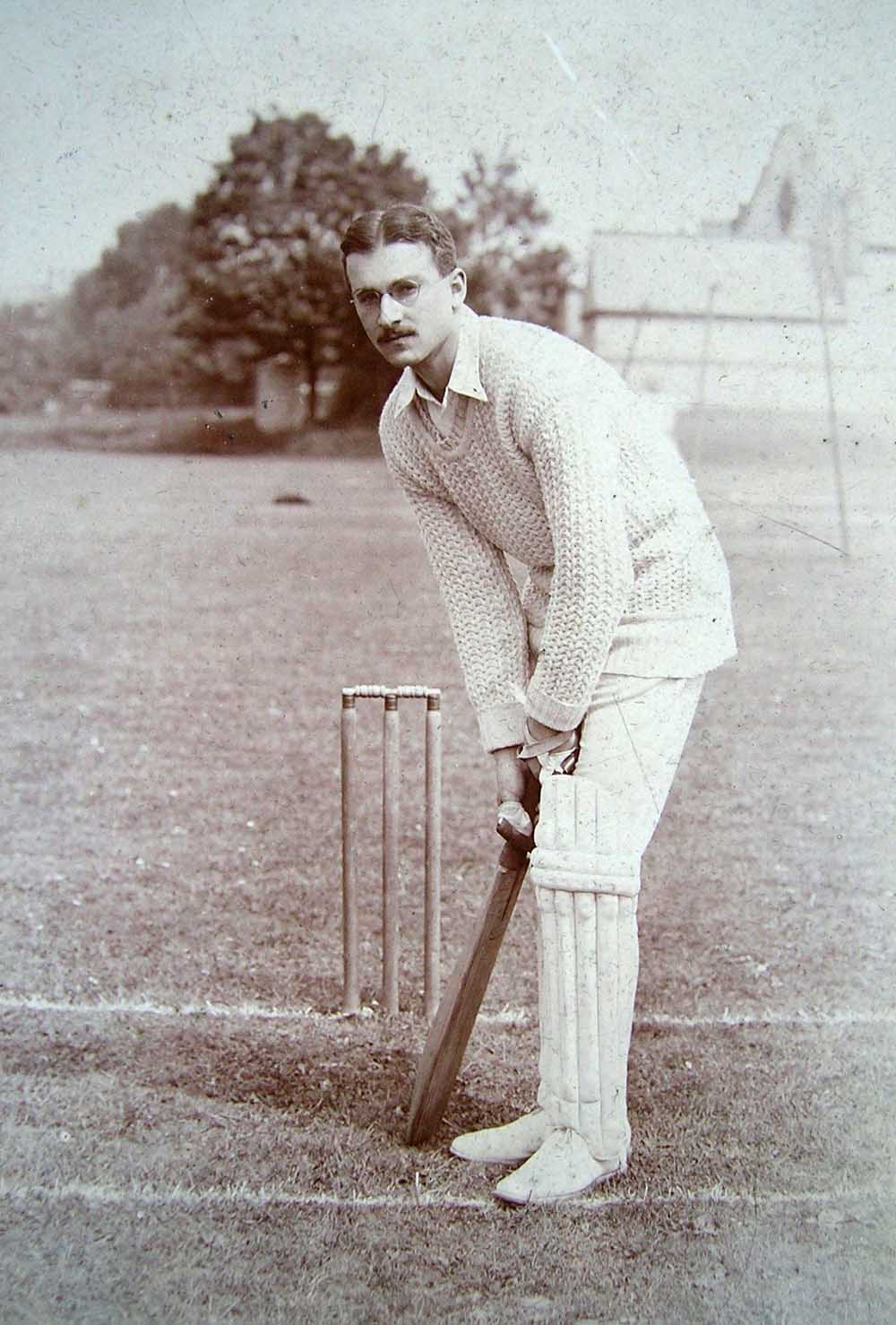

Personal information
- Full name: Eric Leslie Kidd
- Born: 18 October 1889; Westminster, Middlesex, England
- Died: 2 July 1984 (aged 94); Dún Laoghaire, Ireland
- Batting: Right-handed
- Bowling: Leg break
- Relatives: Percy Kidd (father)

Domestic team information
- Years: Team
- 1910–1913: Cambridge University
- 1910–1928: Middlesex
- 1914–1928: Marylebone Cricket Club
- 1921–1928: Ireland

Career statistics
Competition	First-class
Matches	147
Runs scored	5,113
Batting average	24.94
100s/50s	6/22
Top score	167
Balls bowled	6,830
Wickets	186
Bowling average	24.62
5 wickets in innings	8
10 wickets in match	1
Best bowling	8/49
Catches/stumpings	131/–
- Source: Cricinfo, 4 February 2019

Eric Leslie Kidd (18 October 1889 – 2 July 1984) was an English-born Irish cricketer. A right-handed batsman and leg spin bowler, he played 147 first-class cricket matches, mostly for Middlesex, and played for the Ireland cricket team on six occasions.

== Biography ==
Born on 18 October 1889 in Westminster, London, the grandson of Joseph Kidd (1824-1918) and son of Percy Marmaduke Kidd (1851-1942), both eminent doctors, E. L. Kidd was educated at Wellington College, and went on to study at Cambridge University where he made his first-class debut, playing for the university team against Essex in May 1910 and gained his blue when he played against Oxford University later in the year. He remained in the University side for four years and also began to play county cricket for Middlesex, making his debut for them in August 1910 against Yorkshire.

He also played for the MCC and in a few Gentlemen v Players matches, and at the outbreak of World War I was considered as someone who could possibly play Test cricket for England. He graduated from Cambridge with a first in Engineering.

After the war, he had moved to Dublin where he worked for Guinness, and his appearances for Middlesex became rather sporadic by the standards of the time, only playing when on vacation from work in Dublin. He made his debut for Ireland in August 1921, playing against Scotland in a first-class match.

He continued with his occasional appearances for Middlesex, occasionally appearing for other first-class teams such as the Free Foresters, and played for Ireland five more times, once against Scotland and four times against the MCC. His last game for Ireland was in August 1930 against the MCC in Dublin, His last game for Middlesex was a County Championship match against Essex in June 1928, while his final first-class match was for the Free Foresters against Cambridge University. He died on 2 July 1984 in Dún Laoghaire, County Dublin, Ireland.

== Statistics ==
In matches for Ireland, Kidd scored 376 runs at an average of 34.18, with a top score of 73 against Scotland in July 1925. He took 23 wickets at an average of 20.00, with best bowling figures of 5/63 against the MCC in August 1924, the only time he took five wickets in an innings for Ireland. In first-class cricket, he scored 5113 runs at an average of 24.94, with a top score of 167 for Cambridge University against Sussex in 1912. He took 186 wickets at an average of 24.62, with best innings bowling of 8/49 also for Cambridge University against Sussex, this time in 1911. His highest first-class score for Middlesex was 150 not out and his best bowling for them was 4/39.
