= Civil liberties in the United Kingdom =

Area of law in the United Kingdom

Civil liberties in the United Kingdom are part of UK constitutional law and have a long and formative history. This is usually considered to have begun with Magna Carta of 1215, a landmark document in British constitutional history. Development of civil liberties advanced in common law and statute law in the 17th and 18th centuries, notably with the Bill of Rights 1689. During the 19th century, working-class people struggled to win the right to vote and join trade unions. Parliament responded with new legislation beginning with the Reform Act 1832. Attitudes towards suffrage and liberties progressed further in the aftermath of the first and second world wars. Since then, the United Kingdom's relationship to civil liberties has been mediated through its membership of the European Convention on Human Rights. The United Kingdom, through Sir David Maxwell-Fyfe, led the drafting of the Convention, which expresses a traditional civil libertarian theory. It became directly applicable in UK law with the enactment of the Human Rights Act 1998.

A number of legislative changes affecting civil liberties have been debated and enacted since the late 20th century. The Identity Cards Act 2006 was repealed, largely on civil liberty grounds, and the UK does not have a central civilian registry and there are no identification requirements in public. Legislative changes affecting civil liberties were justified by appeals to public safety and National Security, hastened on by crises such as the September 11 attacks, the 7/7 bombings and the 2020 COVID-19 pandemic. The COVID-19 pandemic in the United Kingdom led to the introduction of the Coronavirus Act 2020, which was described by former Justice of the Supreme Court Lord Sumption as "the greatest invasion of personal liberty in [the UK's] history." Nonetheless, vaccines offered through the national immunisation programme in the UK are not mandatory; and vaccinations are also not currently mandatory in the UK during a pandemic. United Kingdom citizens have a negative right to freedom of expression under the common law. Furthermore, a guarantee of freedom of expression is contained in statute in Article 10 of the Human Rights Act. However, there are exceptions including threatening, abusive or insulting words or behavior intending or likely to cause harassment, alarm or distress or cause a breach of the peace (which has been used to prohibit racist speech targeted at individuals). Gun ownership is considered a privilege, not a right, and firearms regulation in the United Kingdom is strict. Members of the public may own certain firearms for the purposes of sport shooting, recreation, hunting or occupational purposes, subject to licensing. Abortion in the United Kingdom is permitted on certain grounds, which are typically interpreted liberally, although the underlying laws are dated and authoritarian. Capital punishment in the United Kingdom has been abolished.

The relationship between human rights and civil liberties is often seen as two sides of the same coin. A right is something you may demand of someone, while a liberty is freedom from interference by another in your presumed rights. However, human rights are broader. In the numerous documents around the world, they involve more substantive moral assertions on what is necessary, for instance, for "life, liberty and the pursuit of happiness", "to develop one's personality to the fullest potential" or "protect inviolable dignity". "Civil liberties" are certainly that, but they are distinctly civil, and relate to participation in public life. As Professor Conor Gearty writes,

Civil liberties is another name for the political freedoms that we must have available to us all if it to be true to say of us that we live in a society that adheres to the principle of representative, or democratic, government.

In other words, civil liberties are the "rights" or "freedoms" which underpin democracy. This usually means the right to vote, the right to life, the prohibition on torture, security of the person, the right to personal liberty and due process of law, freedom of expression and freedom of association.

== Foundations ==
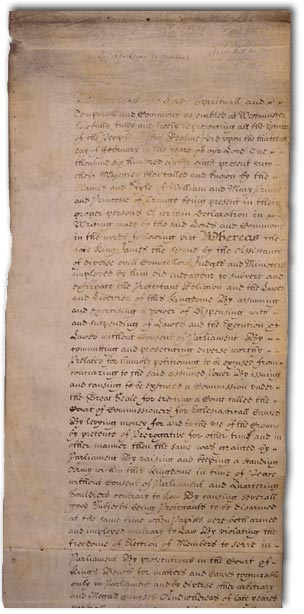
The Bill of Rights 1689 secured the supremacy of Parliament over the King, laying the foundations of representative democracy.

- Magna Carta (1215), supported what became the writ of habeas corpus, trial by one's peers, representation of nobility for taxation, and a ban on retroactive punishment.
- The Case of Proclamations (1610) decided that "the King by his proclamation or other ways cannot change any part of the common law, or statute law, or the customs of the realm" and that "the King hath no prerogative, but that which the law of the land allows him."
- Dr. Bonham's Case (1610), decided that "in many cases, the common law will control Acts of Parliament". This may have influenced Marbury v. Madison (1803) which led to judicial review in the United States.
- The Petition of Right (1628), established the illegality of taxation without parliamentary consent and prohibited arbitrary imprisonment.
- Habeas Corpus Act 1679, safeguarded individual freedom against unlawful imprisonment with right to appeal.
- Bill of Rights 1689, Claim of Right Act 1689, asserted certain rights of Parliament and the individual, and limited the power of the monarch—the result of the Glorious Revolution.
- The Second Treatise on Representative Government (1689) outlines John Locke's ideas for a more civilised society based on natural rights and contract theory.

== Enlightenment ==
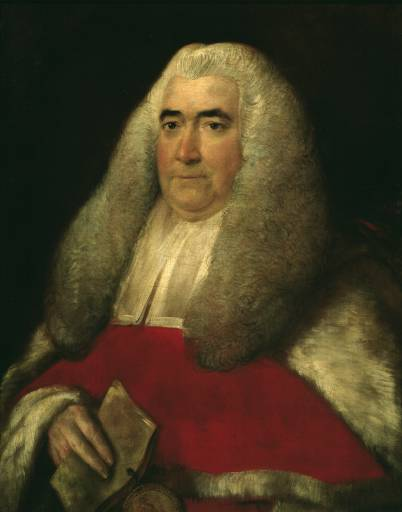
Sir William Blackstone was the archetypal figure of the British Enlightenment, a legal scholar who in his Commentaries professed the liberty of citizens deriving from the Magna Carta and the common law.

- Ashby v White (1703) 1 Sm LC (13th Edn) 253, right to vote cannot be interfered with by a public official.
- Armory v Delamirie (1722) K.B., 1 Strange 505, 93 ER 664, right to property that you find.
- Entick v Carrington (1765), right against arbitrary search and seizure; Lord Camden, quoting almost verbatim from John Locke, held that man entered society to secure his "property" (lives, liberties and estates). His principle was that the individual could do anything not prohibited by law, and the state could do nothing but that which was authorised by law.
- R v Knowles, ex parte Somersett (1772) 20 State Tr 1; (1772) Lofft 1, abolition of slavery, for "the air of England has long been too pure for a slave, and every man is free who breathes it." However, this did nothing for the colonies.
- Trials of John Wilkes.

== Democracy ==
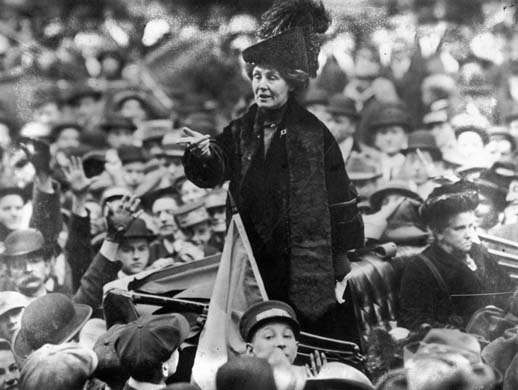
After selling her home, English activist Emmeline Pankhurst travelled constantly, giving speeches throughout Britain and the United States. One of her most famous speeches, Freedom or death, was delivered in Connecticut in 1913.

- Slave Trade Act 1807, abolished the slave trade in the British Empire following a Parliamentary campaign led by William Wilberforce.
- Roman Catholic Relief Act 1829, restored the civil rights of Catholics.
- Great Reform Act 1832, enfranchised slightly more property holders, rationalised the borough and county seat system.
- Slavery Abolition Act 1833, abolished slavery throughout the British Empire.
- Bird v Jones (1845) 7 QB 742, right to liberty, freedom of movement (across bridges).
- Second Reform Act 1867, loosened the property qualification, extended the franchise to around a third of men.
- Conspiracy, and Protection of Property Act 1875, decriminalised trade union activity (freedom of association).
- Beatty v Gillbanks (1882) 9 QBD 308, the Salvation Army wanted to campaign against alcohol with the help of a brass band in Weston-super-Mare. Local brewers formed a so-called "skeleton army", and threatened to disrupt the march with force. The police, fearing for public order told the Salvation Army to call it off, but they went ahead. Then the police forced them, by breaking up the brass band. Field J in the High Court held that there was no right of the police to do so. The Salvation Army was associating "for religious exercises among themselves, and for a religious revival". No one could "say that such an assembly [is] in itself an unlawful one". Stopping the march would be like saying "that a man may be convicted for doing a lawful act—there is no authority for such a proposition."
- Third Reform Act in 1884 and the Redistribution of Seats Act the following year extended the same voting qualifications in the towns to the countryside and established the present-day one-member constituency as the normal pattern for Parliamentary representation.
- Trade Disputes Act 1906, removed liability in tort for trade unions going on strike, after the House of Lords in a series of cases invented ways to bankrupt unions for any action.
- Nairn v The University Court of the University of St Andrews, (1907) 15 SLT 471, 473, per Lord McLaren, it is "a principle of the unwritten constitutional law of this country that men only were entitled to take part in the election of representatives to Parliament."
- Amalgamated Society of Railway Servants v Osborne [1910] AC 87, per Lord Shaw and Lord James, any contributions by trade unions to Members of Parliament were "unconstitutional and illegal". Reversed by the Trade Union Act 1913.
- Representation of the People Act 1918, allowed universal male suffrage for over-21s, and the vote for women over 30.
- Representation of the People Act 1928, universal suffrage over 21.
- Liversidge v Anderson [1942] AC 206.
- Crofter Hand Woven Harris Tweed v Veitch [1942] AC 435, right to collective bargaining.

== Post-World War II ==
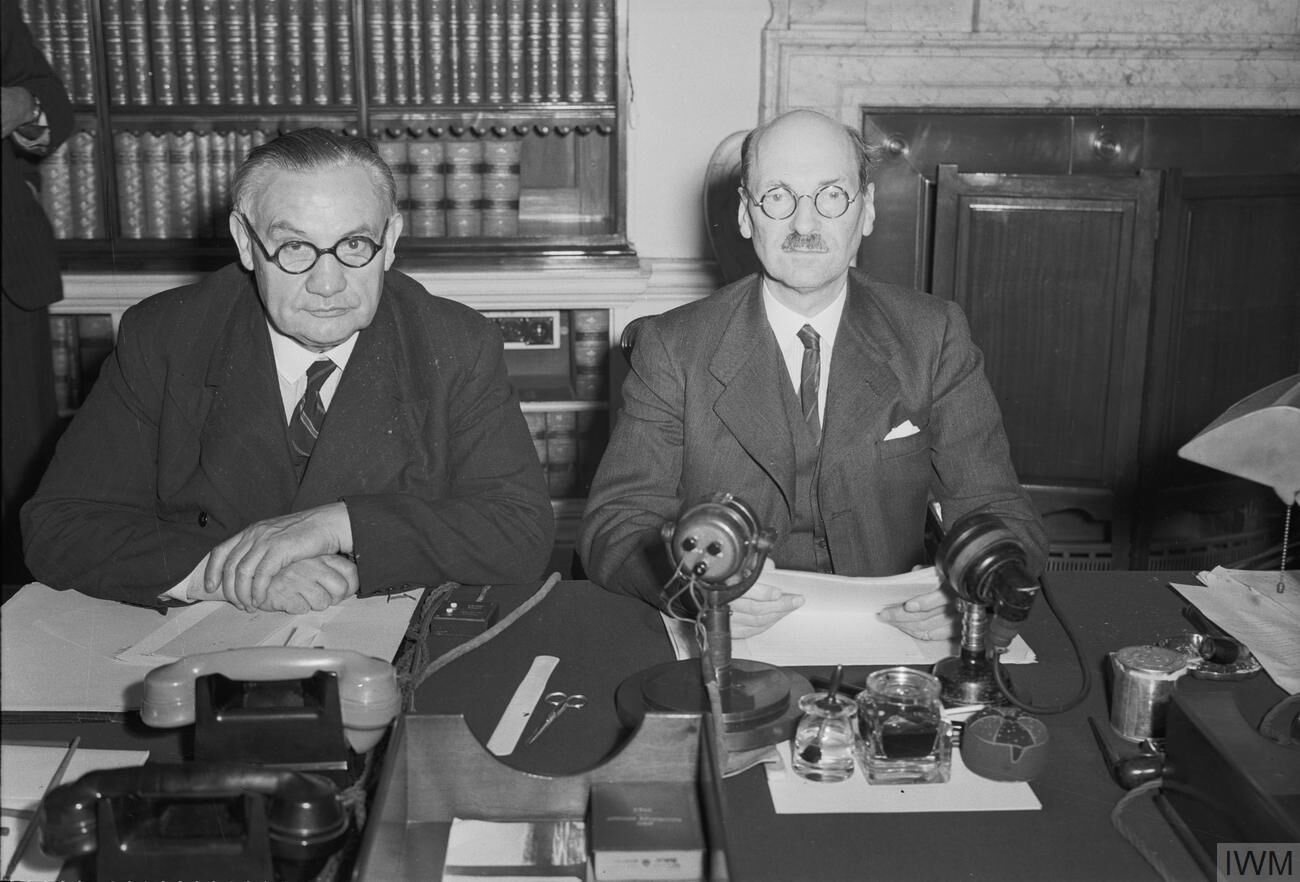
As well as being instrumental in drafting it, the United Kingdom signed up to the European Convention on Human Rights under Clement Attlee and Ernest Bevin in 1950.

- The European Convention on Human Rights was drafted by Sir David Maxwell-Fyfe, at the time, their Chairman of the Council of Europe's legal and administrative division. Clement Attlee's accession to the Convention in 1950.
- The British Empire began granting independence to all its Colonies from India, to Africa to the Pacific.
- The last instance of capital punishment in the United Kingdom was carried out in 1964. It was formally abolished under the Human Rights Act 1998.
- Harold Wilson allows individual petitions to Strasbourg in 1968.
- Golder v United Kingdom [1975] 1 EHRR 524, the first case to arrive at the European Court of Human Rights, a prisoner who was denied a solicitor to make a (probably spurious) libel claim against a guard, was held to have had his right to a fair trial under Art.6 ECHR violated. Access to counsel and court was held to be a necessary element in the right to a fair trial, because otherwise countries could abolish courts and not be in breach.
- Ahmad v Inner London Education Authority [1978] QB 38, the case concerned the right of freedom of religion under Art.9 ECHR, and whether a Muslim man could take time off on Fridays, with pay, to go and worship at his local mosque. His case was turned down both by the Court of Appeal, and by the Commission in Strasbourg. But before it went to Europe, Lord Denning MR, famously said with regard to the Convention:

"We will do our best to see that our decisions are in conformity with it. But it is drawn in such vague terms that it can be used for all sorts of unreasonable claims and provoke all sorts of litigation. As so often happens with high-sounding principles, they have to be brought down to earth. They have to be applied in a work-a-day world."

- The Sunday Times v United Kingdom (1979–80) 2 EHRR 245. The Attorney-General had obtained an injunction preventing The Sunday Times newspaper from publishing an article describing the history of the testing, manufacture and marketing of the drug thalidomide by The Distillers Company, on the grounds that it would prejudice ongoing litigation between Distillers and parents of children who had suffered birth-defects caused by the drug. By 11 votes to 9, the European Court of Human Rights held that the injunction violated the paper's right to freedom of expression under Art.10 ECHR. In response to this judgement the UK parliament passed the Contempt of Court Act 1981.

== 1980s ==
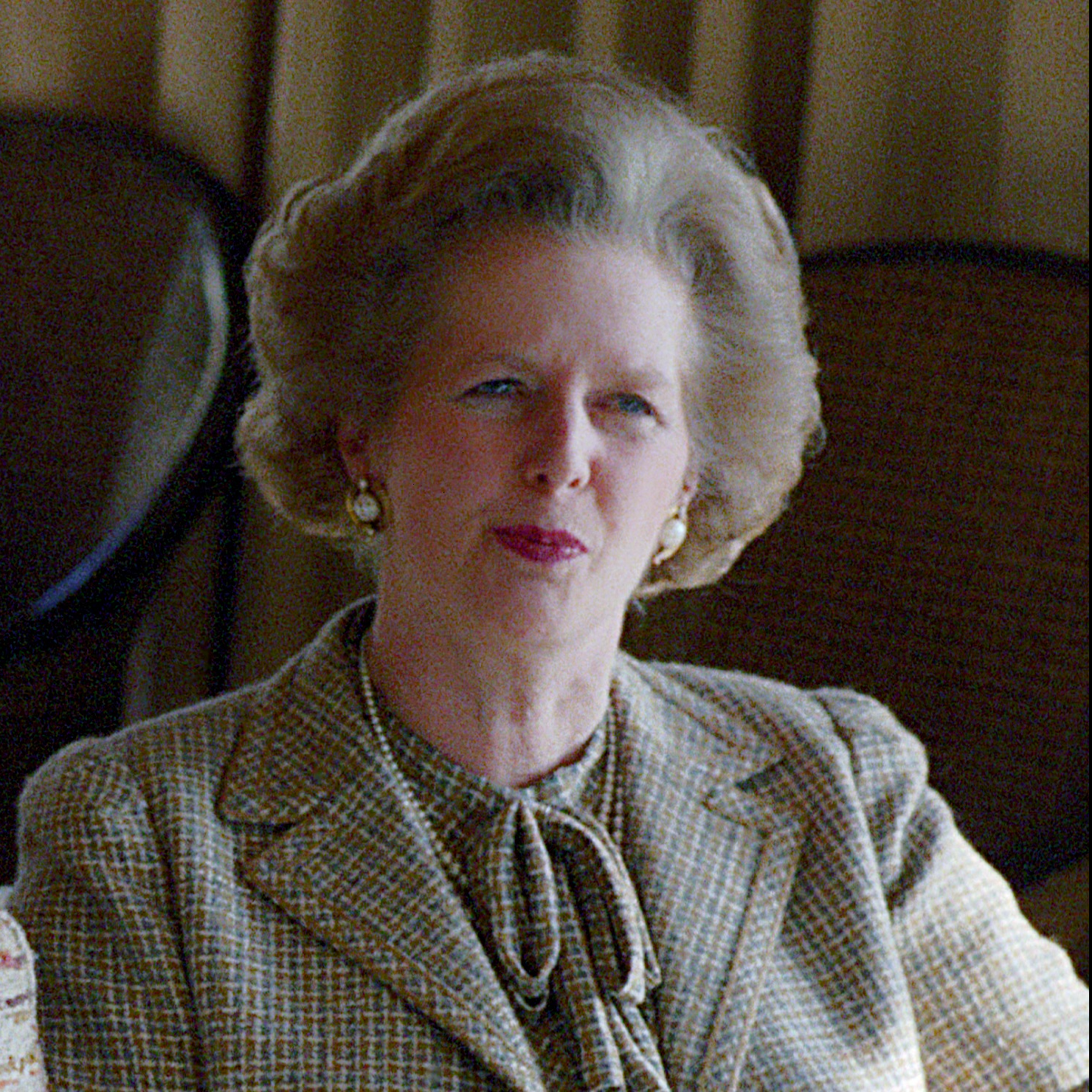
Margaret Thatcher oversaw a gradual tightening of security legislation to crack down on industrial protests and the Provisional IRA.

- Police and Criminal Evidence Act 1984, allowed four days' detention without trial (previously it was 24 hours).
- CCSU v Minister for the Civil Service [1985] AC 374, where GCHQ members were banned by Margaret Thatcher (also the Minister for the Civil Service) from belonging to unions. The House of Lords held that the Royal prerogative was subject to judicial review. Banning unions was within the discretion of the Minister.
- Malone v Metropolitan Police Commissioner [1979] Ch 344, Megarry VC said that the executive could do anything that was not prohibited by law (purporting to reverse Entick v Carrington). This meant that a dodgy antique dealer could not be prosecuted for handling stolen goods based on evidence from a wire tap that the police had no authority under any statute to do.
- Malone v United Kingdom (1984) 7 EHRR 14, said that UK allowing the phone tapping is in breach of its obligations under the ECHR, because there was no law that did 'indicate with reasonable clarity the scope and manner of exercise of the relevant discretion conferred on the public authorities."
- Public Health (Control of Disease) Act 1984 permits the government to impose restrictions or requirements on individuals in the event of a public health emergency. This legislation was used to justify the government's response to the 2020 COVID-19 pandemic.
- Interception of Communications Act 1985, the government's response to the ruling, allowing any phone tapping.
- Public Order Act 1986, passed in the context of widespread industrial disputes, particularly the miners' strike, Part II limited public processions and demonstrations by requiring 6 days advance notice to be given to the police.

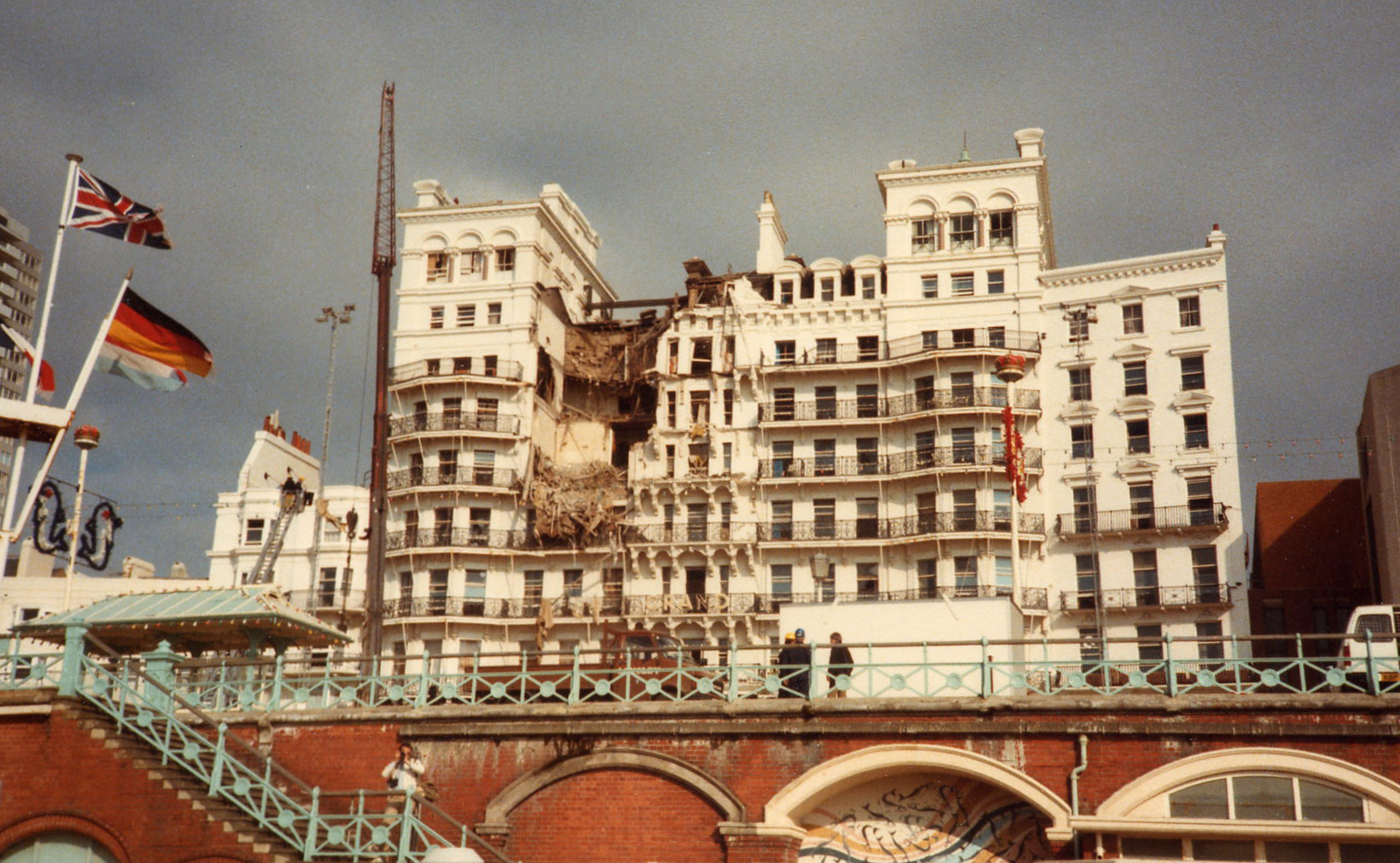
The Brighton Hotel Bombing by the Provisional Irish Republican Army to coincide with the Conservative Party conference preceded a sterner approach to security legislation.

- Official Secrets Act 1989, cf R v Shayler [2002] UKHL 11 (David Shayler)
- Prevention of Terrorism (Temporary Provisions) Act 1989

== 1990s ==
- Attorney-General v Guardian Newspapers Ltd. (No. 2) per Lord Goff of the Judicial Committee of the House of Lords stated in the case the common law principle that "[In England] everybody is free to do anything, subject only to the provisions of the law."
- R v Secretary of State for the Home Department ex parte Brind [1991] 1 AC 696 concerning the dubbing of voices by any IRA members on television. Anthony Lester QC argued that implied in the Home Secretary's discretion must be an adherence to the ECHR's norms on free expression. This was squarely rejected by the House of Lords (Lord Ackner leading the judgement), and on appeal.
- Trade Union and Labour Relations (Consolidation) Act 1992, codified the many restrictions and formalities placed on trade union activity and the right to strike.
  - cf. Wilson v United Kingdom (2002) 35 EHRR 523, where the Strasbourg Court held that UK legislation must uphold the right of workers to join trade unions and take actions to defend their interests.
- Charter 88, a liberal pressure group which took its name from the Czech Charter 77 and advocated institutional reforms modelled on the United States, was addressed by Labour leader John Smith. He promised a Bill of Rights for Britain.
- The Intelligence Services Act 1994 and the Police Act 1997, included powers to intercept communications.

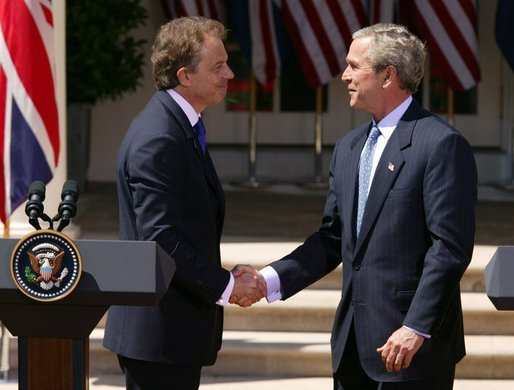
Tony Blair and then-US President George W. Bush both introduced rafts of new security legislation as a reaction to terrorism after the September 11, 2001 attacks and the Iraq War.

- Human Rights Act 1998, for the first time this allowed direct appeal in British courts to be made on the basis of the European Convention on Human Rights. It preserves Parliamentary sovereignty, because courts may not strike down democratically decided laws, they can only issue a "declaration of incompatibility" (s.4). Judges, when interpreting legislation, may also presume that Parliament intended not to derogate from Convention rights (s.3). It is a precondition of a claim to the Strasbourg court that a claimant has exhausted the domestic legal system's avenues for appeal. The main reason for incorporation, and justification from advocates and the Government was to save time and cost. Other countries, such as Germany and France have their own standards, but all follow and stay conformity with the ECHR. Similarly, the ECHR is drawn from the traditions of every member state, and acts as a method for maintaining minimum standards on which there is general consensus. Despite its controversy, this may be viewed as a uniquely British measure, especially given the fact that the Convention was drafted under the direction of the British government.

== 21st century ==
- Terrorism Act 2000, extended the limit to 7 days' detention without charge for terrorist suspects. It also allows terrorist organisations to be banned. Sixty groups have to date been outlawed. The Act also introduced a broad definition of "terrorism" under s.1. The stop and search powers in the Act were used to search protesters at an arms trade fair in Canary Wharf, including a Ph.D. student and a journalist who took legal action as a result. The police action was held to be lawful in R (Gillan) v Commissioner for the Metropolitan Police [2006] UKHL 12.
- Regulation of Investigatory Powers Act 2000, allows the government full surveillance powers of all kinds of communication. The current rate is 30 warrants being issued a week. In the 15 months from July 2005 to October 2006, 2,407 warrants were issued.
- Anti-Terrorism Crime and Security Act 2001, in response to the destruction of the NYC World Trade Center on 9/11, the government passed legislation allowing indefinite detention without trial for non-British nationals suspected of committing terrorist offences, but without enough evidence for an actual trial (cf. Magna Carta, Habeas Corpus Act 1679). When passing Acts of Parliament, under the HRA 1998 the Minister has to make a "statement of compatibility" with the Convention. What they did was to send notice of derogation from the right to a fair trial, Art.6 ECHR. Art.15 ECHR is the derogation provision, which says "In time of war or other public emergency threatening the life of the nation" a member can derogate "to the extent strictly required by the exigencies of the situation". The minister then declared when passing the 2001 Act that it was (with the derogation sent) compatible with the HRA 1998.
- Criminal Justice Act 2003, abrogated double jeopardy in cases with "new and compelling evidence".
- A and Others v Secretary of State for the Home Department [2004] UKHL 17, the majority of the House of Lords decided that the detention without trial under the ATCSA 2001 was discriminatory to non-British nationals, and therefore incompatible under Art.14 ECHR. A declaration of incompatibility was issued under s.4 HRA 1998. Lord Hoffmann was the only dissenting judge to hold that the whole detention without trial idea was incompatible with the right to a trial under Art.6, and that the derogation was unacceptable, because there was no "threat to the life of the nation". He argued strongly that it would be wrong to suggest, with the majority's view that discrimination was the problem, that the government should be allowed to lock up all Britons alike.
- Civil Contingencies Act 2004, allows the government, for an "emergency", to deploy armed forces anywhere in the country during peacetime (cf. Bill of Rights 1689). It also allows property to be sequestrated, for an "emergency" with or without compensation anywhere (cf. Prot. 1, Art.1 ECHR).
- Felony disenfranchisement in the United Kingdom was the topic of ECHR cases and political debate between 2005 and 2012.
- Serious Organised Crime and Police Act 2005, created an offence of inciting religious hatred and requires advanced notification for protests up to 1 kilometre from Parliament. cf Blum v Director for Public Prosecutions.
- Prevention of Terrorism Act 2005, the government in response to A's case passed this allows the Home Secretary to impose control orders on any British citizen. Anybody suspected of terrorist related activities by the Home Secretary, but without any kind of trial, can be electronically tagged, monitored, be restricted from making phone calls, using the internet, be banned from certain kinds of work, can be restricted from going certain places, have one's passport revoked and be under a duty to report to the police. The control order system was held disproportionate in Secretary of State for the Home Department v JJ [2007] UKHL 45. The system was declared incompatible, because there was no derogation. However Lord Brown stated that if a suspect was left with eight hours' liberty a day, then it would have been acceptable.
- Terrorism Act 2006, following the bombings in London on the 7 July, this legislation allows for people suspected of terrorist offences to be detained without charge for up to 28 days. The Criminal Justice Act 2003 had extended the time to 14 days. The government had initially proposed a limit of 90 days, saying this was on the recommendation of the police, and citing support from opinion polls. Opposition among MPs saw the first defeat for the Blair government; the Conservative amendment of 28 days' detention without charge being accepted. The act also created a new offence of "glorifying terrorism".
- Austin v Metropolitan Police Commissioner [2007] EWCA Civ 989, Court of Appeal rejects a charge of false imprisonment and an Art.5 ECHR claim for police holding May Day protestors in Oxford Circus in 2001.
- Counter-Terrorism Bill 2008 sought to extend the number of days' detention without charge to 42 days and to allow the Home Secretary to require an inquest to be established without a jury in secret if they deems it to be in the public interest, the interest of an overseas treaty partner or in the interest of national security. David Davis MP, a Conservative politician and Shadow Home Secretary at the time, resigned his parliamentary seat in June 2008 in protest over the proposed extension to detention with charge. His resignation forced a by-election, which he contested and won on a civil liberties platform. Neither Labour nor the Liberal Democrats stood a candidate. The bill also removed the prohibition on post-charge questioning, gave the police greater powers of property confiscation and gave the police powers to prevented photography in public places.
- The Police Reform and Social Responsibility Act 2011 repealed the Serious Organised Crime and Police Act 2005 prohibitions on protest on parliament square, however, added new restrictions, such as operating amplified noise equipment, erecting tents or using sleeping equipment.
- R v AB and CD (2014) was the first British trial to be held entirely in secret although some of the restrictions were loosened somewhat by the court of appeal after a legal challenge by The Guardian.
- The Investigatory Powers Act 2016 expanded electronic surveillance powers of the British intelligence agencies. It permitted bulk collection of communications data and interception of communication data. It requires CSPs (communication service providers) to retain British internet users' internet connection records for one year, which certain government officials have access to without a warrant. CSPs are neither allowed to refuse assistance to police nor are they allowed to disclose a data request. The act also permits police to carry out targeted equipment interference.
- In 2018, the musician Rhys Herbert (stage name 'Digga D') was given a Criminal Behaviour Order and fitted with a GPS tracker on his leg. He is required to give 24 hours notice to the London metropolitan police before uploading any media and is forbidden from inciting violence, mentioning certain areas of London or making references to certain real-life incidents or people in his music.
- The Health Protection (Coronavirus) Regulations 2020 (England only) gave the police powers to force individuals to isolate if they were suspected of having COVID-19.
- The Coronavirus Act 2020 gives the government powers to suspend or limit public gatherings and detain individuals suspected of having COVID-19.

== See also ==
- Big Brother Watch
- Campaign Against Censorship
- Censorship in the United Kingdom
- Civil and political rights
- Civil libertarianism
- Constitution of the United Kingdom
- Freedom of speech
- Freedom of speech by country § United Kingdom
- History of liberalism
- Human rights in the United Kingdom
- Liberalism in the United Kingdom
- Liberty (pressure group)
- Michael Mansfield
- Mass surveillance in the United Kingdom
- NO2ID
- Parliament in the Making for a summary of the historical development of parliament and civil rights in the UK
- Privacy International
- Taking Liberties - Documentary about the implications of anti terrorism legislation on civil rights in the UK.
- Terrorism in the United Kingdom
