= Ahmad v United Kingdom =

- Court: European Commission on Human Rights
- Citation: (1982) 4 EHRR 126

Case history
- Prior action: Ahmad v Inner London Education Authority [1978] QB 38

Keywords
- Judicial review, human rights, religious discrimination

Ahmad v United Kingdom (1982) 4 EHRR 126 is a UK labour law and UK constitutional law case on race and religious discrimination. It upholds the view that special allowances do not need to be made by employers for people who want to follow particular religious practices, because people are free to choose their jobs. However, it suggests that employers should give genuine and serious consideration about ways to accommodate their employees requests, even if they cannot ultimately do so.

== Facts ==
A teacher, Iftikhar Ahmad was a British citizen born in India in 1940 and a Muslim. He had worked at an inner London primary school, run by the Inner London Education Authority, for maladjusted children from 1968 to 1972. He took study leave and, given the opportunity to change schools, he chose one closer to a mosque. The headmaster allowed him extra time to pray on Fridays at lunch break. He then moved again to Chisern School, Bethnal Green, where his job was to do individual reading with children. The headmistress objected to him being away for an extra 50 minutes. He moved again to Bonner Primary School, Bethnal Green. The headmaster there also refused extra time off, and he went anyway. He moved again to Bethnal Green Primary School. Then he moved again to the Roman Catholic primary school in Mile End. Here he took time off in spite of being told not to. He was told he could take part-time teaching, but he refused and instead he resigned. At this time part-time jobs were not protected by equal pay laws, and often, part-time contracts were paid less per hour than full-time ones.

At tribunal, Dr Pasha said Friday prayer was so important that in Saudi Arabia, three times not attending leads to beheading. One of the main questions was whether under Article 9 ECHR (the right to freedom of religion and conscience) the school ought to have given Mr Ahmad the time off.

== Judgment ==
=== Court of Appeal ===
The Court of Appeal (Scarman LJ dissenting) dismissed the case. Lord Denning MR held,

The convention is not part of our English law, but, as I have often said, we will always have regard to it. We will do our best to see that our decisions are in conformity with it. But it is drawn in such vague terms that it can be used for all sorts of unreasonable claims and provoke all sorts of litigation. As so often happens with high-sounding principles, they have to be brought down to earth. They have to be applied in a work-a-day world. I venture to suggest that it would do the Muslim community no good - or any other minority group no good - if they were to be given preferential treatment over the great majority of the people. If it should happen that, in the name of religious freedom, they were given special privileges or advantages, it would provoke discontent, and even resentment among those with whom they work. As, indeed, it has done in this very case. And so the cause of racial integration would suffer. So, whilst upholding religious freedom to the full, I would suggest that it should be applied with caution, especially having regard to the setting in which it is sought. Applied to our educational system, I think that Mr. Ahmad's right to "manifest his religion in practice and observance" must be subject to the rights of the education authorities under the contract and to the interests of the children whom he is paid to teach. I see nothing in the European Convention to give Mr. Ahmad any right to manifest his religion on Friday afternoons in derogation of his contract of employment: and certainly not on full pay.

Scarman LJ said there was a duty to accommodate devout Muslims, even if it involved additional cost, because Art.9 required the right of worship to be unimpeded.

=== European Commission ===
The European Commission of Human Rights held that there was not even interference with his freedom of religion under Art.9(1) (at 23). Freedom of religion is not absolute and 'it may as regards the modality of a particular religious manifestation, be influenced by the situation of the person claiming that freedom' (para 11). It also noted that United Kingdom society was with its increasing Muslim community in a period of transition.' But they also made the point that there was no failure to consider better working arrangements.

== See also ==
- Employment discrimination law in the UK
