= On Liberty (Chakrabarti book) =

2014 book

- First edition
- Author: Shami Chakrabarti
- Language: English
- Published: 2 October 2014
- Publisher: Allen Lane
- Pages: 208
- ISBN: 9781846148095

On Liberty is a book published in October 2014 by the civil rights campaigner Shami Chakrabarti.

In November 2015 the books publisher was forced to pay out substantial damages to Martin Hemming, the former director general of legal services at the British Ministry of Defence because of false claims in the book. The publishers apologised for the "hurt and distress caused" by the allegations, confirmed they were "without foundation", and agreed to pay Hemming damages and legal costs.
