= Shami Chakrabarti =

British politician (born 1969)

The Right Honourable The Baroness Chakrabarti CBE PC
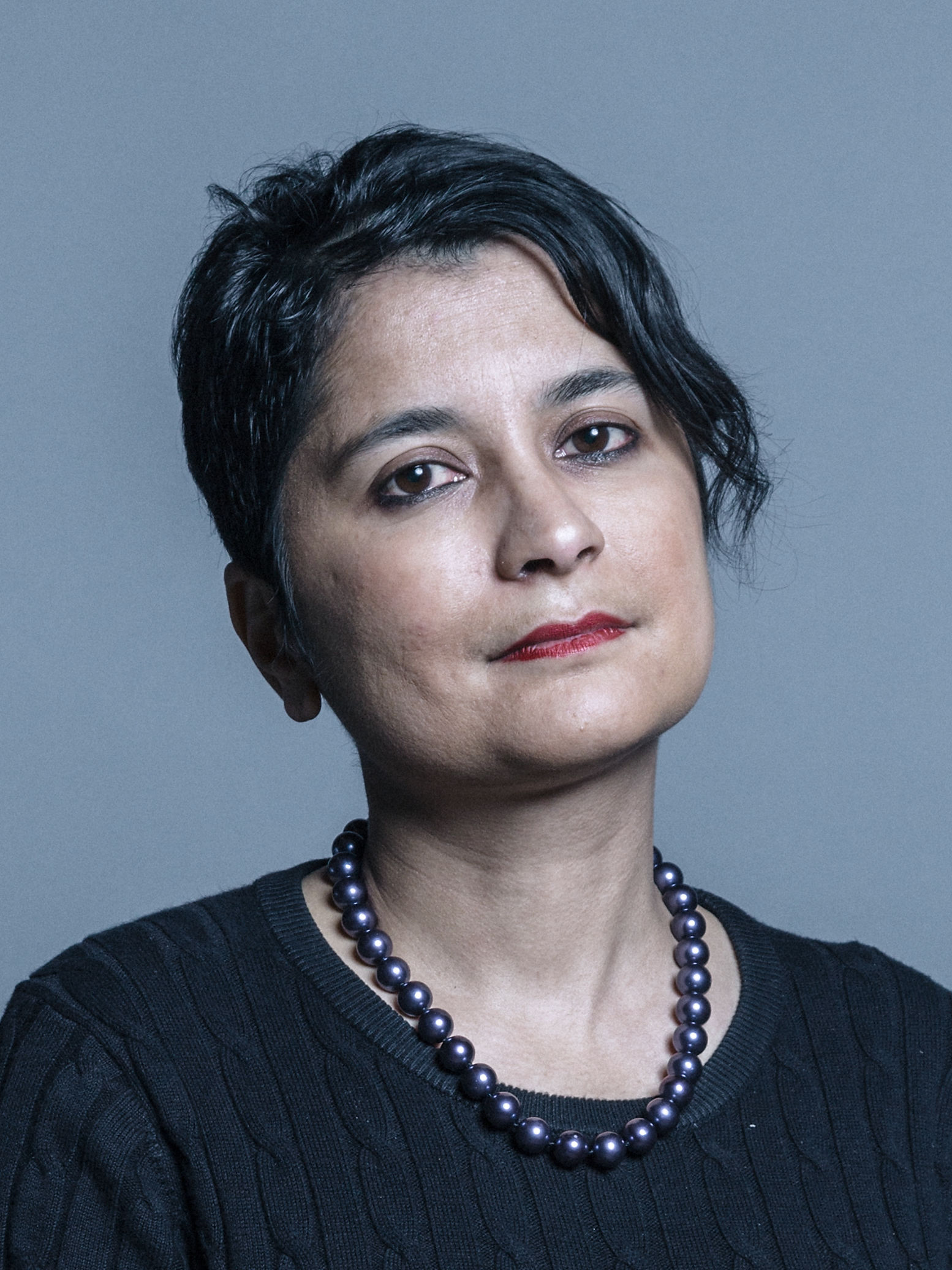
- Official portrait, 2018

Shadow Attorney General
- In office 6 October 2016 – 6 April 2020
- Leader: Jeremy Corbyn
- Preceded by: Karl Turner
- Succeeded by: The Lord Falconer of Thoroton

Member of the House of Lords
- Lord Temporal
- Life peerage 6 September 2016

Chancellor of the University of Essex
- In office 2 September 2014 – 22 July 2017
- Vice Chancellor: Anthony Forster
- Preceded by: The Lord Phillips of Sudbury
- Succeeded by: John Bercow

Chancellor of Oxford Brookes University
- In office 2008–2015
- Vice Chancellor: Janet Beer
- Preceded by: Jon Snow
- Succeeded by: Katherine Grainger

Personal details
- Born: Sharmishta Chakrabarti; 16 June 1969 (age 57) Kenton, London, England
- Party: Labour (since 2016)
- Spouse: Martyn Hopper (m. 1995; div. 2014)
- Children: 1
- Education: Bentley Wood High School; Harrow Weald Sixth Form College
- Alma mater: London School of Economics (LLB)
- Chakrabarti's voice Desert Island Discs, 2 November 2008

Sharmishta Chakrabarti, Baroness Chakrabarti (born 16 June 1969), is a British politician, barrister, and human rights activist. A member of the Labour Party, she served as the director of Liberty, a major advocacy group which promotes civil liberties and human rights, from 2003 to 2016. From 2016 to 2020, she served as Shadow Attorney General for England and Wales.

Chakrabarti was born in the London Borough of Harrow, and studied law at the London School of Economics. After graduating, she was called to the Bar and then worked as an in-house legal counsel for the Home Office. When she was the director of Liberty, she campaigned against what Liberty considered "excessive" anti-terror legislation. In this role, she frequently contributed to BBC Radio 4 and various newspapers, and was described in The Times as "probably the most effective public affairs lobbyist of the past 20 years". She was one of the panel members of the Leveson Inquiry into press standards throughout 2011 and 2012. Between 2014 and 2017, she served as Chancellor of the University of Essex.

In August 2016, Chakrabarti was made a life peer in the Prime Minister's Resignation Honours.

== Early life ==
Chakrabarti was born to Bengali Indian parents in the suburb of Kenton in the London Borough of Harrow. Her father, a bookkeeper, has been cited by Chakrabarti as an influence on her gaining an interest in civil liberties. She attended Bentley Wood High School, a girls' comprehensive school, then Harrow Weald Sixth Form College. She was a member of the SDP.

Both her parents were educated in Roman Catholic schools in Calcutta, while she herself attended a Baptist Sunday school as a child. In 2007, she broadcast a Lent talk for BBC Radio 4.

She studied law at the London School of Economics, at one point acting as a research assistant to Leonard Leigh, who wrote a paper on the British approach to terrorism and extradition; the paper was finally published in 1997. After graduating with an LLB degree in 1991, Chakrabarti was called to the Bar by the Middle Temple in 1994. In 1996, she started working as a barrister for the Home Office.

== Liberty ==
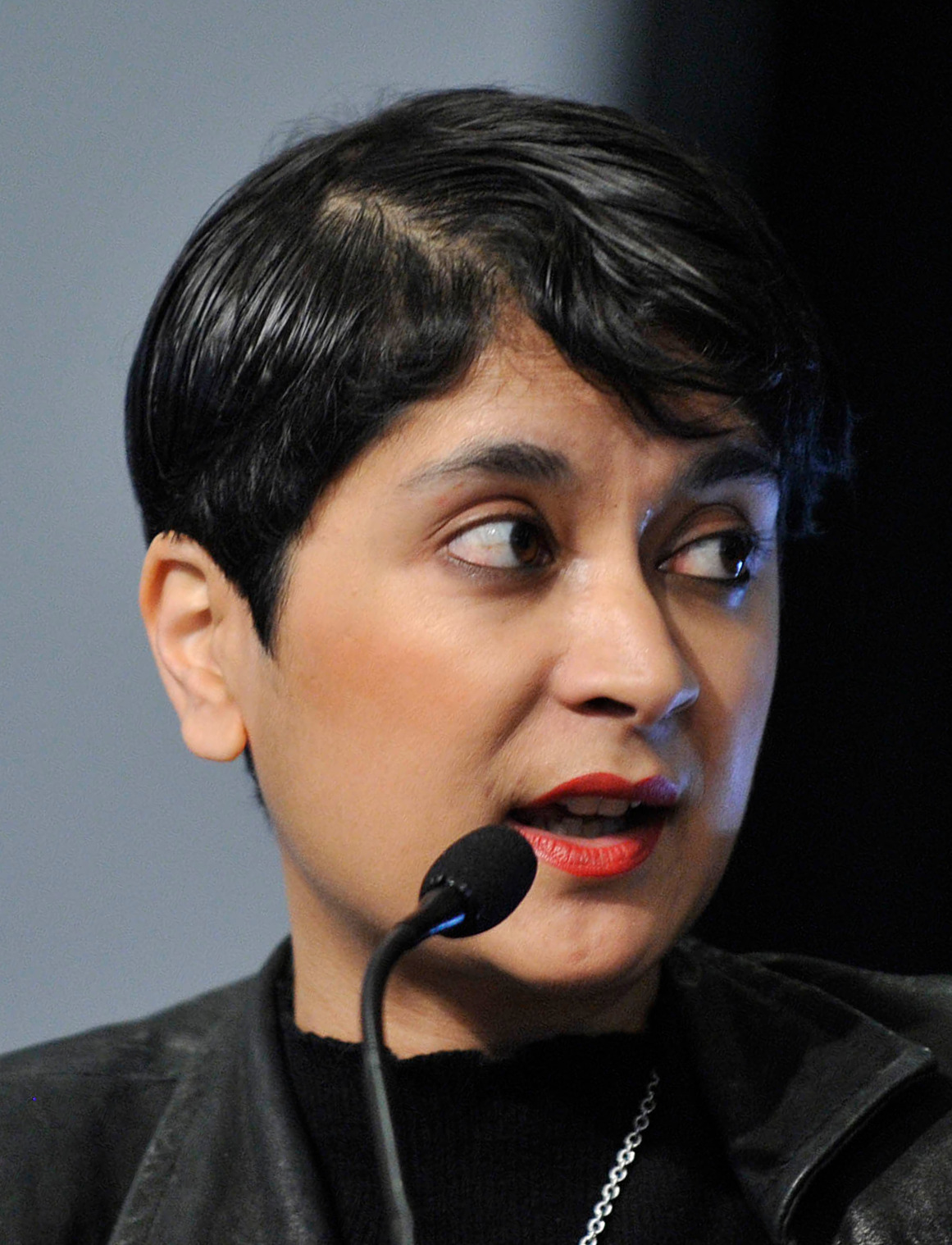
Chakrabarti in 2014

After working as in-house counsel, Chakrabarti was appointed director of Liberty in 2003. As director, she campaigned against what the pressure group saw as the "excessive" anti-terrorist measures that followed the September 11 attacks in the United States, such as the Anti-terrorism, Crime and Security Act 2001 (ATCSA). The organisation is a prominent opponent of recent counter-terrorism legislation.

Chakrabarti is a frequent contributor to BBC Radio and TV and various newspapers on the topic of human rights and civil liberties. The Observer wrote that she puts in "seemingly endless appearances on Question Time and the rolling news bulletins". She was also described by David Aaronovitch in The Times as "probably the most effective public affairs lobbyist of the past 20 years".

In December 2005, the BBC Radio 4 Today programme ran a poll of listeners to establish "who runs Britain." After many hours of debate, Today placed Chakrabarti on the shortlist of ten people "who may run Britain."

She was shortlisted in the Channel 4 Political Awards 2006 for the "Most Inspiring Political Figure" award. It was voted for by the public and she came second to Jamie Oliver, above Tony Blair, David Cameron, George Galloway and Bob Geldof.

In 2009, Shami Chakrabarti called Prevent the "biggest spying operation in Britain in modern times".

Chakrabarti stepped down as the director of Liberty on 31 March 2016. Martha Spurrier was announced as her successor.

=== Andy Burnham ===
In June 2008, Andy Burnham, then British Secretary of State for Culture, Media and Sport, made what Chakrabarti claimed were "insinuations" in an interview in Progress magazine about Shadow Home Secretary David Davis's resignation over the 42-day detention for terror suspects. Davis, a Conservative MP, was said by Burnham to have had "late-night, hand-wringing, heart-melting phone calls with Shami Chakrabarti." Chakrabarti received an apology from Burnham for his "innuendo and attempted character assassination".

=== Damian Green ===
On 18 April 2009, it was reported in The Times and The Daily Telegraph that police officers who raided the parliamentary office of the Conservative frontbencher Damian Green and arrested him as part of an inquiry into the leaking of Home Office documents had searched through e-mails and computer documents going back a number of years, using Chakrabarti's name as one of the keywords. The Times reported her as saying that she believed the action of Scotland Yard's anti-terror squad "raises very serious questions about just how politicised, even McCarthyite, this operation was."

=== Phil Shiner ===
Phil Shiner is a British former human rights solicitor and was Head of Strategic Litigation at Public Interest Lawyers (International) from 2014 until the firm's closure in August 2016, when he was struck off the roll of solicitors in England and Wales over misconduct relating to false abuse claims against British troops. Shiner's disgrace resulted in criticism by former army officers of Chakrabarti and her support for Shiner.

Johnny Mercer MP, a retired Army captain, chided Chakrabarti for her "almost child-like understanding of military operations" and for "trying to retrospectively apply European Human Rights Law to the battlefield". Richard Kemp, a retired Army colonel and commander of the first Task Force Helmand in Afghanistan in 2003, accused Chakrabarti of being "one of [Shiner's] greatest supporters". She said that she had been saddened by Shiner's downfall and had said that, before "losing his way", he had "given good service to the public" and "did some very good work that has been upheld by a judicial inquiry".

=== London School of Economics ===
When the London School of Economics accepted a £1.5 million donation from Saif al-Islam Gaddafi, the son of former Libyan leader Muammar Gaddafi, Chakrabarti was on the governing board of the institution. Chakrabarti stated that she did not "attend the 2009 Council meeting which approved a donation to the school from Saif Gaddafi's Foundation" and that she "only subsequently raised concerns about links with Mr Gaddafi, given his father's appalling regime." She went on to state that she did not think "the decision in question resulted from anything other than a naive assessment, made in good faith, of the democratic reforming ambitions of the dictator's son."

Howard Davies, LSE Director at the time, resigned over the issue, citing "personal error of judgement." Chakrabarti was accused of hypocrisy by the Student Rights project of the Henry Jackson Society as being "the director of a human rights group while legitimizing murderous regimes" as a governor of the LSE and they called for her (and others) to resign from the LSE. Anthony Glees, director of Buckingham University's Centre for Security and Intelligence Studies, also said Chakrabarti should resign.

On 9 December 2011, Chakrabarti wrote to the Metropolitan Police asking them to investigate the legality of the donations. Chakrabarti admitted to feeling "bucketfuls" of embarrassment and shame about the affair and in April 2013 her spokesman confirmed that she had severed all ties with the LSE.

== Leveson Inquiry ==
In July 2011, Chakrabarti was announced as one of the panel members of the Leveson Inquiry, a judicial inquiry into phone hacking in the UK. Chakrabarti described her invitation onto the Inquiry as "a daunting privilege" and said it reflected Liberty's "belief in an appropriate balance between personal privacy and media freedom and above all in the Rule of law".

On behalf of Liberty, Chakrabarti welcomed the principal recommendation of a more robust and independent press self-regulator, but said Liberty would be unable to support the Report's last-resort alternative of compulsory statutory regulation.

She was one of two panel members to waive their right to claim fees or expenses for the duration of the inquiry.

== Labour Party ==
=== Labour Party inquiry ===
Following her appointment in April 2016 as chair of an inquiry into antisemitism and other forms of racism in the Labour Party, Chakrabarti announced that she had joined the party in order to gain members' trust and confidence, and expressed confidence that this would not compromise her independence. Chakrabarti criticised the Conservative Party for not conducting their own inquiry into Islamophobia, following allegations from Sayeeda Warsi in London's 2016 mayoral election against Sadiq Khan. The Chakrabarti Inquiry report was published in June 2016 and concluded that Labour was "not overrun by anti-Semitism, Islamophobia, or other forms of racism," but that there was an "occasionally toxic atmosphere".

Jeremy Corbyn announced her as the only Labour appointment to the House of Lords in August 2016. This was a necessary step to her subsequent appointment as Shadow Attorney General. However, some (including Labour MPs Tom Watson and Wes Streeting) saw this as creating the potential for bias in what should have been an independent inquiry. When asked about the appointment, a spokesman for Corbyn said that Chakrabarti was "an ideal appointment to the Lords".

=== Labour peerage and shadow cabinet ===
On 6 September 2016, she was created a life peer as Baroness Chakrabarti, of Kennington in the London Borough of Lambeth. The following month, she was appointed Shadow Attorney General for England and Wales to the Corbyn shadow cabinet.

== Anglo-American relations ==
Chakrabarti is an alumna of the British-American Project, and has been a governor of the Ditchley Foundation.

== Personal life ==
Chakrabarti was married to Martyn Hopper, a litigation lawyer, from 1995 until they divorced in 2014.

She opposes grammar schools on the grounds of social divisiveness and because she says they enforce segregation. Her son was a former pupil of Dulwich College, a fee-paying private school, leading some to attack her views on education as hypocritical.

Chakrabarti lives in Lambeth, South London. She identifies as a feminist. Her favourite novel is To Kill a Mockingbird by Harper Lee.

Chakrabarti was portrayed by Indira Varma in the 2019 film Official Secrets.

== Awards and honours ==
Chakrabarti is a member of the Foundation for Information Policy Research advisory council.

She was appointed a Commander of the Order of the British Empire (CBE) in the 2007 Queen's Birthday Honours.

In 2011, she was awarded the President's Medal by the British Academy.

She was one of eight Olympic Flag carriers at the London 2012 Summer Olympics opening ceremony (the announcer incorrectly described her as "the founder of Liberty"). She was assessed as one of the 100 most powerful women in the United Kingdom in 2013 by Woman's Hour on BBC Radio 4, and in 2014 she was included in The Sunday Times's "100 Makers of the 21st Century" list.

In May 2018, it was announced that Chakrabarti was to be sworn of the Privy Council of the United Kingdom. This usually allows the style "The Right Honourable", however, as a peer, she is already styled as such and therefore uses the post-nominal "PC".

=== Scholastic ===
University degrees

Location	Date	School	Degree
England	1991	London School of Economics	Bachelor of Laws (LLB)

Chancellor, visitor, governor, and fellowships

Location	Date	School	Position
England	2008 – 2015	Oxford Brookes University	Chancellor
England	7 November 2006 –	Middle Temple	Master of the Bench
England	2007 –	Goldsmiths, University of London	Honorary Fellowship
England	September 2014 – July 2017	University of Essex	Chancellor
England	2014 –	University of Manchester	Honorary Law Professorship
England		Nuffield College, Oxford	Visiting Fellowship
England		Mansfield College, Oxford	Honorary Fellowship
England	– April 2013	London School of Economics	Governor
England	2016 –	Cumberland Lodge	Visiting Fellowship
England	2 March 2017 –	Lucy Cavendish College, Cambridge	Honorary Fellowship
England	1 February 2018 –	University of Bristol	Honorary Law Professorship

Honorary degrees

Location	Date	School	Degree
England	19 July 2005	Loughborough University	Doctor of Letters (DLitt)
England	2006	University of Roehampton	Doctorate
England	2006	Sheffield Hallam University	Doctor of the University (DUniv)
England	2007	Staffordshire University	Doctor of the University (DUniv)
England	2007	University of East Anglia	Doctor of Laws (LLD)
England	July 2007	University of Hull	Doctorate
England	25 July 2008	University of Sussex	Doctor of Laws (LLD)
England	1 May 2009	Open University	Doctor of the University (DUniv)
England	15 July 2010	University of Exeter	Doctor of Laws (LLD)
England	21 July 2010	University of Southampton	Doctor of Letters (DLitt)
Wales	13 July 2011	University of Glamorgan	Doctor of the University (DUniv)
England	18 July 2011	Middlesex University	Doctorate
England	4 December 2012	Newcastle University	Doctor of Civil Law (DCL)
England	2013	York St John University	Doctor of Laws (LLD)
Wales	13 July 2015	Cardiff Metropolitan University	Doctor of the University (DUniv)
England	4 September 2015	Oxford Brookes University	Doctor of the University (DUniv)
England	2015	Brunel University London	Doctor of Letters (DLitt)
England	9 December 2016	University of London	Doctor of Laws (LLD)

== On Liberty ==
On Liberty, Chakrabarti's first book, was published by Allen Lane in 2014. In November 2015, a settlement was announced of a High Court libel case brought by Martin Hemming, formerly the Legal Adviser to the Ministry of Defence, concerning false allegations made by Chakrabarti. The publishers apologised for the "hurt and distress caused" by the allegations, confirmed they were "without foundation", and agreed to pay Hemming damages and legal costs.

== Bibliography ==
- Chakrabarti, Shami (1 October 2015). On Liberty. Penguin. ISBN 978-0-1419-7631-0.
- Chakrabarti, Shami (1 March 2018). Of Women: In the 21st Century. Penguin. ISBN 978-0-1419-8535-0.
- Chakrabarti, Shami (2 May 2024). Human Rights: The Case for the Defence. Penguin. ISBN 978-0-2415-8881-9.

== See also ==
- Taking Liberties – a 2007 film in which Shami Chakrabarti was one of the participants

Non-profit organization positions
Preceded by John Wadham	Director of Liberty; 2003–2016	Succeeded by Martha Spurrier
Academic offices
Preceded by Jon Snow	Chancellor of Oxford Brookes University; 2008–2015	Succeeded by Katherine Grainger
Preceded by The Lord Phillips of Sudbury	Chancellor of the University of Essex; 2014–2017	Succeeded by John Bercow
Political offices
Preceded by Karl Turner	Shadow Attorney General; 2016–2020	Succeeded by The Lord Falconer of Thoroton
Orders of precedence in the United Kingdom
Preceded by The Baroness Bloomfield of Hinton Waldrist	Ladies; Baroness Chakrabarti	Followed by The Baroness Cavendish of Little Venice
