= Malone v United Kingdom =

United Kingdom constitutional law case

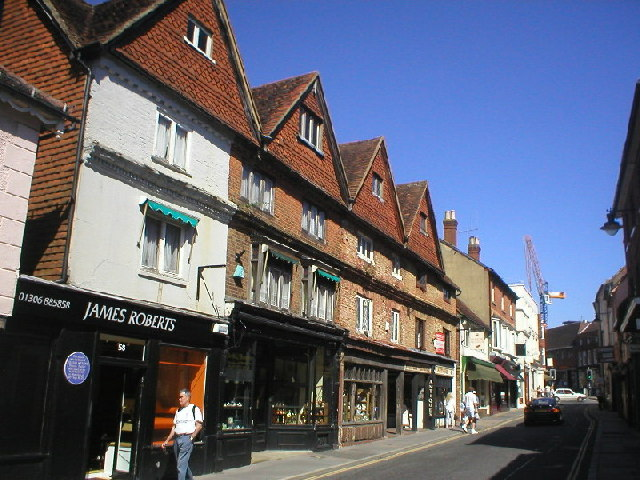
- Antique shops in Dorking
- Court: European Court of Human Rights
- Citations: [1984] ECHR 10, (1984) 7 EHRR 14

Case history
- Prior action: Malone v Metropolitan Police Commissioner [1979] Ch 344

Keywords
- Rule of law

Malone v United Kingdom [1984] ECHR 10 is a UK constitutional law case, concerning the rule of law.

== Facts ==
James Malone, an antique dealer in Dorking, claimed that intercepting his telephone conversations, on authority of a warrant by the Secretary of State for Home Affairs, was unlawful, and asked for an injunction against the Metropolitan Police Commissioner for monitoring his telephone. There was no overall statutory code governing interception of communications, although the Post Office Act 1969 Schedule 5, para 1, stated that it was an offence to interfere in post or telephone communications unless "the act constituting the offence was done in obedience to a warrant under the hand of a Secretary of State." Malone was charged with handling stolen property, namely around £10,000 in UK, US and Italian banknotes and a grandfather clock. The prosecution admitted that evidence was from phone tapping. Malone argued that (1) even with a warrant the Home Secretary could not monitor confidential conversations without consent, (2) Malone had a right of property, privacy and confidentiality in conversations, and (3) that the interception violated ECHR article 8, ‘respect for his private and family life, his home and his correspondence’. The Metropolitan Police argued there was no remedy in English law for monitoring and disclosure of the conversations, and no remedy for breach of human rights. After losing the High Court judgment, Malone ultimately appealed to the European Court of Human Rights.

== Judgment ==
=== High Court ===
Sir Robert Megarry VC held that the European Convention on Human Rights was not justiciable in England, and therefore Article 8 of the convention created no legal or equitable right. When tapping was done for crime prevention by the Post Office for police, there was no law against it. Tapping on the warrant of the Home Secretary was effective in law. Unlike searches and seizures involving trespass, there was no immunity based on a property right (except copyright) in telephone conversations, and no general right of privacy at common law or under the Wireless Telegraphy Act 1949 section 5, which related only to unauthorised interceptions. Nor did Malone have any contractual right of confidentiality from telephones, and breach of any confidentiality right was excused for detecting or preventing crime. In any case the Post Office intercepted the messages, so a claim against the Metropolitan Police would fail in its entirety. A matter so complex as phone tapping was for Parliament, not the Courts. Megarry VC remarked that the situation in English law compared very unfavourably to West Germany, exemplified by the Klass case, and cried out for legislation, which would be compatible with the Convention. In the course of his judgment he said the following:

I have already held that, if such tapping can be carried out without committing any breach of the law, it requires no authorisation by statute or common law; it can lawfully be done simply because there is nothing to make it unlawful. Now that I have held that such tapping can indeed be carried out without committing any breach of the law, the contention necessarily fails. I may also say that the statutory recognition given to the Home Secretary's warrant seems to me to point clearly to the same conclusion.

=== European Court of Human Rights ===
The European Court of Human Rights held that the UK allowing the phone tapping was in breach of its obligations under ECHR article 8, because there was no express law that indicated "with reasonable clarity the scope and manner of exercise of the relevant discretion conferred on the public authorities." There was an interference with article 8, which was not justified because phone tapping was not "in accordance with the law". This required adequate clarity about circumstances in which one's communications may be intercepted.

20. It has for long been the practice for the interception of postal and telephone communications in England and Wales to be carried out on the authority of a warrant issued by a Secretary of State, nowadays normally the Secretary of State for the Home Department (the Home Secretary). There is no overall statutory code governing the matter, although various statutory provisions are applicable thereto. The effect in domestic law of these provisions is the subject of some dispute in the current proceedings. Accordingly, the present summary of the facts is limited to what is undisputed, the submissions in relation to the contested aspects of these provisions being dealt with in the part of the judgment "as to the law". ...
24. The existence of a power vested in the Secretary of State to authorise by warrant the interception of correspondence, in the sense of detaining and opening correspondence transmitted by post, has been acknowledged from early times and its exercise has been publicly known (see the Birkett report, Part I, especially paras. 11, 17 and 39). The precise origin in law of this executive authority is obscure (ibid., para. 9). Nevertheless, although none of the Post Office statutes (of 1710, 1837, 1908 or 1953) contained clauses expressly conferring authority to intercept communications, all recognised the power as an independently existing power which it was lawful to exercise (ibid., paras. 17 and 38).
25. At the time of the Birkett report, the most recent statutory provision recognising the right of interception of a postal communication was section 58 sub-section 1 of the Post Office Act 1953, which provides:
  If any officer of the Post Office, contrary to his duty, opens ... any postal packet in course of transmission by post, or wilfully detains or delays ... any such postal packet, he shall be guilty of a misdemeanour ... .
  Provided that nothing in this section shall extend to ... the opening, detaining or delaying of a postal packet ... in obedience to an express warrant in writing under the hand of a Secretary of State.
  ...
28. The power to intercept telephone messages has been exercised in England and Wales from time to time since the introduction of the telephone. Until the year 1937, the Post Office, which was at that time a Department of Government, acted upon the view that the power which the Crown exercised in intercepting telephone messages was a power possessed by any operator of telephones and was not contrary to law. Consequently, no warrants by the Secretary of State were issued and arrangements for the interception of telephone conversations were made directly between the police authorities and the Director-General of the Post Office. In 1937, the position was reviewed by the Home Secretary and the Postmaster General (the Minister then responsible for the administration of the Post Office) and it was decided, as a matter of policy, that it was undesirable that records of telephone conversations should be made by Post Office servants and disclosed to the police without the authority of the Secretary of State. The view was taken that the power which had for long been exercised to intercept postal communications on the authority of a warrant of the Secretary of State was, by its nature, wide enough to include the interception of telephone communications. Since 1937 it had accordingly been the practice of the Post Office to intercept telephone conversations only on the express warrant of the Secretary of State (see the Birkett report, paras. 40–41). ...
29. Under the Post Office Act 1969, the "Post Office" ceased to be a Department of State and was established as a public corporation of that name with the powers, duties and functions set out in the Act. In consequence of the change of status of the Post Office and of the fact that the Post Office was no longer under the direct control of a Minister of the Crown, it became necessary to make express statutory provision in relation to the interception of communications on the authority of a warrant of the Secretary of State. ...
30. The 1969 Act also introduced, for the first time, an express statutory defence to the offences under the Telegraph Acts ... similar to that which exists under section 58 para. 1 of the Post Office Act 1953. This was effected by paragraph 1 sub-paragraph 1 of Schedule 5 to the Act, which reads:
  In any proceedings against a person in respect of an offence under section 45 of the Telegraph Act 1863 or section 11 of the Post Office (Protection) Act 1884 consisting in the improper divulging of the purport of a message or communication or an offence under section 20 of the Telegraph Act 1868 it shall be a defence for him to prove that the act constituting the offence was done in obedience to a warrant under the hand of a Secretary of State.
  ...
67. ... The Court would reiterate its opinion that the phrase "in accordance with the law" does not merely refer back to domestic law but also relates to the quality of the law, requiring it to be compatible with the rule of law, which is expressly mentioned in the preamble to the Convention (see, mutatis mutandis, the above-mentioned Silver and Others judgment, p. 34, para. 90, and the Golder judgment of 21 February 1975, Series A no. 18, p. 17, para. 34). The phrase thus implies – and this follows from the object and purpose of Article 8 (art. 8) – that there must be a measure of legal protection in domestic law against arbitrary interferences by public authorities with the rights safeguarded by paragraph 1 (art. 8-1) (see the report of the Commission, paragraph 121). Especially where a power of the executive is exercised in secret, the risks of arbitrariness are evident (see the above-mentioned Klass and Others judgment, Series A no. 28, pp. 21 and 23, paras. 42 and 49). Undoubtedly, as the Government rightly suggested, the requirements of the Convention, notably in regard to foreseeability, cannot be exactly the same in the special context of interception of communications for the purposes of police investigations as they are where the object of the relevant law is to place restrictions on the conduct of individuals. In particular, the requirement of foreseeability cannot mean that an individual should be enabled to foresee when the authorities are likely to intercept his communications so that he can adapt his conduct accordingly. Nevertheless, the law must be sufficiently clear in its terms to give citizens an adequate indication as to the circumstances in which and the conditions on which public authorities are empowered to resort to this secret and potentially dangerous interference with the right to respect for private life and correspondence. ...
69. Whilst the exact legal basis of the executive's power in this respect was the subject of some dispute, it was common ground that the settled practice of intercepting communications on behalf of the police in pursuance of a warrant issued by the Secretary of State for the purposes of detecting and preventing crime, and hence the admitted interception of one of the applicant's telephone conversations, were lawful under the law of England and Wales. The legality of this power to intercept was established in relation to telephone communications in the judgment of Sir Robert Megarry dismissing the applicant's civil action (see paragraphs 31–36 above) and, as shown by the independent findings of the Birkett report (see paragraph 28 in fine above), is generally recognised for postal communications.
70. The issue to be determined is therefore whether, under domestic law, the essential elements of the power to intercept communications were laid down with reasonable precision in accessible legal rules that sufficiently indicated the scope and manner of exercise of the discretion conferred on the relevant authorities. ...
79. The foregoing considerations disclose that, at the very least, in its present state the law in England and Wales governing interception of communications for police purposes is somewhat obscure and open to differing interpretations. The Court would be usurping the function of the national courts were it to attempt to make an authoritative statement on such issues of domestic law (see, mutatis mutandis, the Deweer judgment of 27 February 1980, Series A no. 35, p. 28, in fine, and the Van Droogenbroeck judgment of 24 June 1982, Series A no. 50, p. 30, fourth sub-paragraph). The Court is, however, required under the Convention to determine whether, for the purposes of paragraph 2 of Article 8 (art. 8-2), the relevant law lays down with reasonable clarity the essential elements of the authorities' powers in this domain. Detailed procedures concerning interception of communications on behalf of the police in England and Wales do exist (see paragraphs 42–49, 51–52 and 54–55 above). What is more, published statistics show the efficacy of those procedures in keeping the number of warrants granted relatively low, especially when compared with the rising number of indictable crimes committed and telephones installed (see paragraph 53 above). The public have been made aware of the applicable arrangements and principles through publication of the Birkett report and the White Paper and through statements by responsible Ministers in Parliament (see paragraphs 21, 37–38, 41, 43 and 54 above). Nonetheless, on the evidence before the Court, it cannot be said with any reasonable certainty what elements of the powers to intercept are incorporated in legal rules and what elements remain within the discretion of the executive. In view of the attendant obscurity and uncertainty as to the state of the law in this essential respect, the Court cannot but reach a similar conclusion to that of the Commission. In the opinion of the Court, the law of England and Wales does not indicate with reasonable clarity the scope and manner of exercise of the relevant discretion conferred on the public authorities. To that extent, the minimum degree of legal protection to which citizens are entitled under the rule of law in a democratic society is lacking. (iii) Conclusion
80. In sum, as far as interception of communications is concerned, the interferences with the applicant's right under Article 8 (art. 8) to respect for his private life and correspondence (see paragraph 64 above) were not "in accordance with the law".

== Significance ==
After the Malone decision, Parliament passed the Interception of Communications Act 1985 allowing any phone tapping with a warrant. In the Regulation of Investigatory Powers Act 2000 sections 1-11 recast the rules on the interceptions of communications with a warrant. The Data Retention and Investigatory Powers Act 2014 made more amendments, enabling also widespread powers to intercept and store internet communications. In R (David Davis MP and Tom Watson MP) v Secretary of State for the Home Department (2015) an action for judicial review challenged DRIPA 2014 as being against the Human Rights Act 1998 and the CFREU. In turn the Investigatory Powers Act 2016 updated DRIPA 2014, but was named the "Snooper's Charter" in the media for the virtually unlimited powers of surveillance. It passed Parliament using Conservative votes, while Labour abstained, and the Liberal Democrats voted against. It allows public bodies to access internet records without a warrant. In 2016, the Court of Justice of the European Union held that general retention of data is unlawful, meaning that under EU law (as almost certainly under the European Convention) such mass surveillance is unlawful.

R (Fewings) v Somerset CC disapproved the view of Megarry VC that not every government act requires legal authority.

== See also ==
- United Kingdom constitutional law
- R (Daly) v Secretary of State for the Home Department [2001] UKHL 26... which concerned a policy that prisoners must be absent from their cells when legal correspondence kept there was examined. Lord Bingham of Cornhill, with whose speech the other members of the House agreed, summarised the effect of the earlier authorities concerning prisoners, including Ex parte Leech: "Among the rights which, in part at least, survive [imprisonment] are three important rights, closely related but free standing, each of them calling for appropriate legal protection: the right of access to a court; the right of access to legal advice; and the right to communicate confidentially with a legal adviser under the seal of legal professional privilege. Such rights may be curtailed only by clear and express words, and then only to the extent reasonably necessary to meet the ends which justify the curtailment."
