= Martha Spurrier =

British barrister and human rights campaigner (born 1986)

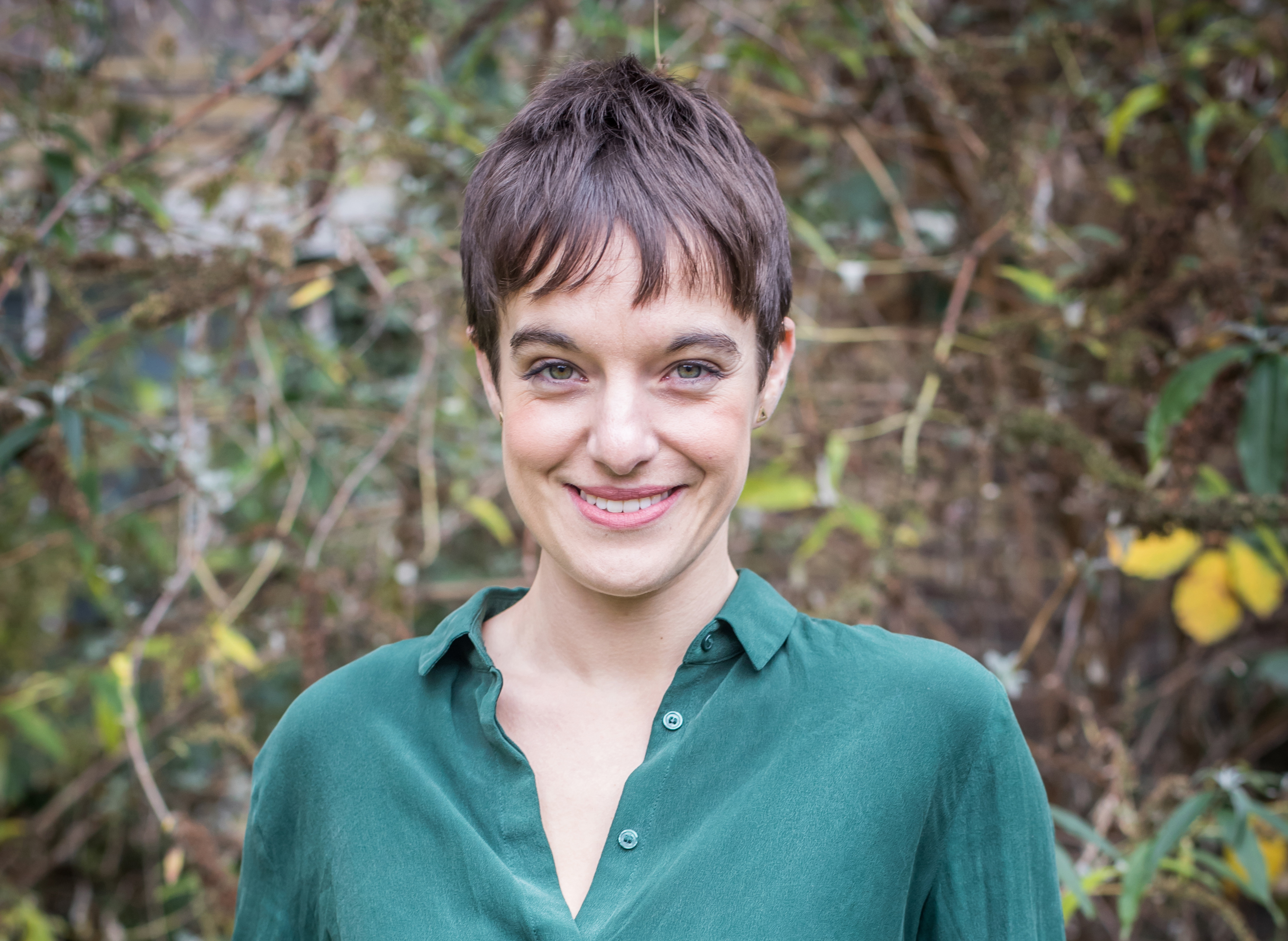
- Spurrier in 2016
- Born: 1986 (age 39–40)
- Education: Godolphin and Latymer School; Emmanuel College, University of Cambridge, BA (Hons); City University London; BPP University
- Occupations: Barrister, human rights campaigner
- Known for: Former director of advocacy group Liberty
- Spouse: Jesse Nicholls

Martha Spurrier (born 1986) is a British barrister and human rights campaigner. She was the director of the advocacy group Liberty from 2016 to 2024.

== Early life ==
Spurrier was educated at Godolphin and Latymer School in London, and then at Emmanuel College, Cambridge, where she graduated with a BA (Hons) in history. She took a law conversion course at City University London, and then the bar professional training course at BPP University.

== Career ==
Before joining Liberty, Spurrier worked as a barrister at Doughty Street Chambers, of which she remains an associate tenant. She is the author of Freedom to Write: A User's Guide (published by English PEN in 2012), a contributing editor to the Rights and Freedoms volume in Halsbury's Laws of England (2013 and 2018), and co-authored the second edition of Disabled Children: A Legal Handbook (published by the Legal Action Group in 2016).

In 2015, she was one of the three joint founders of the "Act for the Act" campaign (with Caoilfhionn Gallagher and Fiona Bawdon), a crowdfunded advertising campaign to tell positive stories about the Human Rights Act 1998.

Spurrier took up her post at Liberty at the end of May 2016, taking over from Shami Chakrabarti. She was replaced as director by Akiko Hart in January 2024.

In July 2018, Spurrier was awarded the "Hero Award" at the 20th Annual ISPA (Note: Internet Services Providers’ Association) Awards by the ISPA Council for challenging the Investigatory Powers Act in the High Court.

She was appointed earlier this year Visiting Professor in Law at Goldsmiths University of London in January 2020.

In 2024, Spurrier was appointed as an independent expert advisor to the McCullough Review, which examined allegations that the Police Service of Northern Ireland unlawfully spied on journalists.

Spurrier's appointment to the Criminal Cases Review Commission was announced in May 2026, at which time she stated: "I am delighted to be taking up the Commissioner role and look forward to working collaboratively with the team to investigate miscarriages of justice with rigour, inquisitiveness and independence of mind. I have spent my career working on human rights, justice and accountability and I look forward to contributing my expertise and experience to the vital work of the CCRC."

In September 2026, Spurrier's forthcoming book The End of Law: Power, Freedom and the Pursuit of Justice, described as a "landmark exploration of the law", was acquired for publication by The Bodley Head.

== Personal life ==
She is married to fellow barrister Jesse Nicholls.
