= Walter Aubrey Kidd =

British physician and medical and zoological writer (1852–1929)

Walter Aubrey Kidd FRSE MRCS FZS (20 July 1852 – 21 February 1929) was a British physician and medical and zoological author.

== Life ==
He was born in Blackheath, London on 20 July 1852, the son of Dr Joseph Kidd and his wife, Sophia McKern. His brothers included Dr Percy Kidd. He was educated at Rottingdean then Uppingham School.

He followed in the family tradition and studied medicine at Corpus Christi College in Cambridge from 1870 later gaining his doctorate (MD) at the University of London. He worked at Guy's Hospital in London and as a GP in Blackheath.

In 1907 he was elected a Fellow of the Royal Society of Edinburgh. His proposers were Daniel John Cunningham, Charles E. S. Phillips, Ramsay Heatley Traquair and George Archdall O'Brien Reid.

He retired in 1915 and moved to Cheltenham in 1918. He moved to South Africa in 1927.

He died of heart failure on 21 February 1929 at Peak's View in the Rondebosch suburb of Cape Town in South Africa.

== Lamarckism ==
Kidd was a supporter of Lamarckian evolution. He took interest in studying the evolution of mammalian hair and wrote several books on this topic. He was the author of Use-Inheritance Illustrated by the Direction of Hair on the Bodies of Animals, 1901. The book argued for the inheritance of acquired characters, based on observations of the direction of hair on the bodies of animals. Herpetologist Inez Whipple Wilder wrote a seven page review of Kidd's The Direction of Hair in Animals and Man in the Science journal.

He also authored Initiative in Evolution.

== Family ==
He married Alice Harriet Benn (died 1947) in 1881.

They had four children: Alice Sophie Kidd, Walter Shirley Kidd, Edward Aubrey Kidd, and Hubert John Kidd.

== Selected publications ==
- Kidd, Walter (8 August 1901). "Hair on the Digits of Man". Nature. 64 (1658): 351. doi:10.1038/064351a0. S2CID 4020933.
- —— (1901b). Use-Inheritance: Illustrated by the Direction of Hair on the Bodies of Animals. London: Adam and Charles Black. OCLC 4105047 (all editions).
- —— (1903). The Direction of Hair in Animals and Man. London: Adam and Charles Black. OCLC 8524243 (all editions).
- —— (1907). The Sense of Touch in Mammals and Birds: with special reference to the papillary ridges. London: Adam and Charles Black. OCLC 8770442 (all editions).
- —— (1920). Initiative in Evolution. London: H.F. & G. Witherby. OCLC 3107124 (all editions).
