= Sylvia Scaffardi =

Sylvia Scaffardi (born Crowther-Smith; 20 January 1902 – 27 January 2001) was an English civil rights campaigner and one of the co-founders of the National Council for Civil Liberties (NCCL), later known as Liberty. Later in life, she became a published writer.

== Early life and education ==
Scaffardi was born in 1902, and came from a large Anglo-Brazilian family. She was educated at a boarding school in Eastbourne in Sussex.

== Activism ==
Scaffardi was working as an actress in London in 1926 when she met Ronald Kidd, with whom she co-founded the National Council for Civil Liberties (NCCL), later known as Liberty. Scaffardi provided essential administrative support in the early years of the organisation as Assistant Secretary and sat on the Executive Committee until the mid-1950s. When P. N. Furbank accused the NCCL of being a communist front, Scaffardi denied this, but did admit that there had been "some contact between the Council and the Communist Party headquarters."

Scaffardi was never religious and described herself as a "lifetime humanist". Scaffardi was a lifelong supporter of Liberty and also joined the Green Party UK in the late 1980s.

== Writing ==
Scaffardi became a published writer later in life and "when her back gave out and she could no longer do her gardening." Her first book Fire Under The Carpet: Working for Civil Liberties in the 1930s was published in 1982. This was followed by Finding My Way, which explored her childhood and later activism with the NCCL.

Scaffardi's papers are held in the archives of the Brynmor Jones Library at the University of Hull. A 1986 oral history interview of her life is held in the Sutton Archives.

== Personal life and death ==
At the age of 56, she married John Scaffardi, who died in 1971. She died in 2001, aged 99.
