= Percy Kidd =

English doctor

Percy Marmaduke Kidd (13 February 1851 – 21 January 1942) was an English medical doctor.

Born at Blackheath in Kent in 1851, the oldest of the eight children of Dr Joseph Kidd and his first wife Sophia McKern. He was educated at Uppingham School where he excelled at sports, becoming captain of the cricket XI in 1868 and 1869, playing in the rugby XV and was Athletic Champion in 1869. He went up to Balliol College, Oxford, graduating with a First Class degree in Natural Sciences in 1873.

Like his father, he became an eminent London doctor, training at St Bartholomew's Hospital under Dr Samuel Gee and Dr John Wickham Legg, qualifying in 1878. He was awarded a Radcliffe travelling fellowship, visiting Strasbourg and Vienna, before working at St Barts, the City of London Hospital for Diseases of the Chest and the Brompton Hospital before moving to the London Hospital. In 1885 he was elected Fellow of the Royal College of Physicians. He specialised in conditions of the chest, including tuberculosis, and was the author of A Contribution to the Pathology of Hæmophilia (London, 1878) and gave the Lumleian Lectures on Some Moot Points in the Pathology and Clinical History of Pneumonia in 1912). In 1918 he delivered the Harveian Oration On the Doctrine of Consumption in Harvey's Time and Today.

Three of Kidd's brothers, Walter Aubrey Kidd FRSE (1852–1929), Leonard Joseph Kidd (1858–1926) and Francis Seymour Kidd (1978–1934), and one of his sisters, Beatrice Mary Kidd, also became doctors. In 1881 he married Gertude Eleanor Harrison (1855–1940). The couple had four children, including Leslie Kidd who played cricket for Cambridge University, Middlesex and Ireland.

Kidd made one appearance in first-class cricket for Kent County Cricket Club in 1874, playing against the Gentlemen of Marylebone Cricket Club at the St Lawrence Ground in Canterbury. In the two innings in which he batted he scored two ducks. He enjoyed salmon fishing, playing golf and music.

Kidd died at Chalfont St. Giles in Buckinghamshire in 1942, aged 90.
