= Shahram Taghavi =

Shahram Taghavi is a barrister practising in the United Kingdom. He is a specialist in judicial review, human rights, immigration and EU law. He was called to the bar of England and Wales in 1994. He is a partner at Article 1, a law firm specialising in immigration, EU freedoms of movement and human rights law. He practised as an independent barrister at Doughty Street Chambers specialising in human rights, immigration and public law. He was joint head of the Human Rights and Public law departments and head of the Immigration department at Simons Muirhead & Burton solicitors. He was a Senior Barrister at Bates Wells & Braithwaite LLP as a member of their Public & Regulatory, Human Rights and Immigration departments, Deputy Head of Human Rights and Immigration at Lewis Silkin LLP, Head of Human Rights and Immigration at Charles Russell LLP (now Charles Russell Speechly LLP) and National Head of Immigration and Human Rights at Grant Thornton LLP.

He has appeared in numerous "test" cases on human rights and migration . He is a contributing author to Tolley's Employment and Personnel Procedures, Human Rights Act 1998, A Practical Guide, a contributing author to the Blackstone's Guide to the Asylum and Immigration Act 2004, the Guide to the Points-Based System and the founder and former editor of the Immigration and Nationality Law Reports from 1997 to 2001. He also taught Constitutional and Administrative law at the School of Oriental and African Studies, University of London from 2001 to 2004 whilst practising at the Bar.

Shahram Taghavi is recognised as a leading lawyer in the following fields by the Legal 500: immigration litigation; administrative & public law; civil liberties & human rights. He has been recommended as a leading lawyer in the following fields in Chambers and Partners: Civil Liberties, Personal immigration; Business immigration. The directories have described him as "brains on legs", "excellent", having a "dynamic touch" and a "calm and reassuring manner and inside-out knowledge of immigration law", a lawyer whose "knowledge shines through", and a "respected advocate".

The UK Chambers & Partners has described him as "Absolutely first class in terms of his knowledge and pragmatism".

He has acted pro bono in numerous high-profile human rights cases, including the Trafigura Ivory Coast toxic waste dump incident, prohibiting the Turkish authorities from torturing a leading political leader, and representing dozens of victims and relatives of the Grenfell Tower fire.

Shahram Taghavi has been involved in many of the key test cases challenging the Home Secretary's tightening of the UK's human rights and immigration laws such as Pankina, the successful challenge to the coalition government's 2010 immigration cap and Alvi. He was also the lawyer behind the challenge to the UK's secret 'blacklist' that permits British officials to actively discriminate against certain (undisclosed) nationalities. He continues to lecture on human rights, immigration and public law and is regularly called as an expert witness on immigration and human rights law in civil and criminal matters.

He is founder of "We Are You", a non profit mentoring scheme introducing young refugee children to adult first generation refugees who have excelled in their professions.
