= Liberty (advocacy group) =

UK advocacy group and membership organisation

Liberty The National Council for Civil Liberties
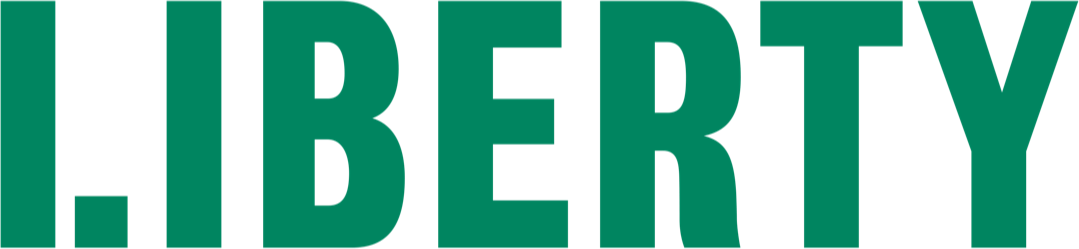
- Formation: 22 February 1934; 92 years ago
- Type: Political pressure group
- Legal status: Trust
- Purpose: Human rights
- Headquarters: London, England
- Director: Akiko Hart
- Website: www.libertyhumanrights.org.uk

Liberty, formerly, and still formally, called the National Council for Civil Liberties (NCCL), is an advocacy group and membership organisation based in the United Kingdom, which challenges unjust laws, protects civil liberties and promotes human rights. It does this through the courts, in Parliament and in the wider community. Liberty also aims to engender a "rights culture" within British society. The NCCL was founded in 1934 by Ronald Kidd and Sylvia Crowther-Smith (later Scaffardi), motivated by their humanist convictions.

During the 1950s, the NCCL campaigned for reform of the mental health system, under which people known to be sane but deemed 'morally defective' – unmarried mothers, for example – could be locked up in an asylum. By 1957, the campaign had seen the release of around 2,000 inmates, the abolition of the Mental Deficiency Act 1913, and the establishment of new Mental Health Review Tribunals which culminated in the Mental Health Act 1959.

Since 2016, Liberty's work has been dominated by a High Court challenge to the Investigatory Powers Act, as well as campaigning against the so-called 'hostile environment' policies which allow indefinite immigration detention in the UK.

In autumn 2019, the organisation set up Liberty Investigates, an editorially independent journalism unit. Its initial focus was on how the coronavirus pandemic affects Human Rights in the UK.

== History ==
=== Foundation and early years ===
The National Council for Civil Liberties (NCCL) was founded in 1934, following the events at the end of the National Hunger March 1932 and in advance of the second hunger march. The inaugural meeting took place in the church of St. Martin-in-the-Fields in London on 22 February, and a letter published in The Times and The Guardian newspapers announced the formation of the group, citing "the general and alarming tendency to encroachment on the liberty of the citizen" as the reason for its establishment. The first Secretary was Ronald Kidd, and first President was the novelist E. M. Forster; vice-presidents were the politician and author A. P. Herbert and the journalist Kingsley Martin of the New Statesman. H. G. Wells, Lewis Clive, Vera Brittain, Clement Attlee, Rebecca West, Edith Summerskill and Harold Laski were also founder members.

The first campaign was against the criminalisation of pacifist or anti-war literature. Under the proposed Incitement to Disaffection Bill, commonly known as the 'Sedition Bill', it would have been a criminal offence to possess pacifist literature, for example anti-war pamphlets. Although the Bill became law as the Incitement to Disaffection Act 1934, NCCL succeeded in watering it down. Other prominent early themes included campaigning against fascists, against film censorship and support for striking miners in Nottinghamshire.

=== World War II ===
When Oswald Mosley was released from prison in 1943 (he had been imprisoned without trial under Defence Regulation 18B), the National Council for Civil Liberties demanded his continued imprisonment. A.W. Brian Simpson notes that the NCCL "had become an enthusiastic supporter of detention without trial". Harold Nicolson and 38 others resigned from the NCCL over the issue.

=== Liberty ===
In 1989, NCCL rebranded as "Liberty". During this period, the organisation was headed by Andrew Puddephatt and John Wadham.

On 10 September 2001, Shami Chakrabarti joined Liberty. After working as in-house counsel, she was appointed director of Liberty in 2003. As director, she began campaigning against what the pressure group saw as the "excessive" anti-terrorist measures that followed the 11 September 2001 attacks in the United States, such as the Anti-terrorism, Crime and Security Act 2001 (ATCSA). Liberty became increasingly high-profile, with Chakrabarti making regular appearances in the media. She was described in The Times newspaper as "the most effective public affairs lobbyist of the past 20 years".

Since the 2015 UK general election, Liberty has spearheaded the campaign to save the Human Rights Act. In August 2015, Chakrabarti said Liberty intended to become "more vigilant and active" in Scotland. She later shared a platform with Scotland's First Minister Nicola Sturgeon to jointly defend the HRA.

In January 2016 it emerged that Chakrabarti was standing down as Liberty's director. Martha Spurrier took up the post at the end of May.

Since 2016, Liberty's work has been dominated by taking a High Court challenge to the Investigatory Powers Act, and campaigning against the so-called 'hostile environment' policies and for an end to the use of indefinite immigration detention in the UK. In autumn 2019, the organisation set up Liberty Investigates, an editorially independent journalism unit that sits within Liberty. The unit formally launched in April 2020 with an initial focus on how the coronavirus pandemic is affecting Human Rights in the UK.

In January 2024, Akiko Hart took over the role of director of Liberty.

== Campaigns ==
=== Post-war ===
BBC ban

During the 1940s, the NCCL led protests against a BBC ban on artists who attended a 'People's Convention' organised by the Communist Party.

Soldiers' civil liberties

In the years following the Second World War, the NCCL campaigned for better civil liberties protections for members of the Armed Forces, including for better education and vocational training, a fairer military justice system and freedom of voluntary association.

Miscarriages of justice

At this time NCCL was also involved in several miscarriage of justice cases, including that of Emery, Powers and Thompson, who were sentenced to between four and ten years' imprisonment for assaulting a police officer, even though someone else confessed to the crime and the prosecution evidence was flawed. NCCL found a witness who confirmed the men's alibi and they were released from prison and granted a royal pardon.

Reform of the Mental Health System

During the 1950s NCCL campaigned for reform of the mental health system, under which people known to be sane but deemed 'morally defective' – unmarried mothers, for example – could be locked up in an asylum.

By 1957, the campaign had seen the release of around 2,000 former inmates, the abolition of the Mental Deficiency Act 1913 and the establishment of new Mental Health Review Tribunals and the Mental Health Act 1959.

=== 1960–1974 ===
In the 1960s the organisation broadened its scope, particularly from 1966 under new general secretary Tony Smythe. It campaigned on racial issues, on behalf of the Romani community, children, prisoners and servicemen who had changed their decision about joining the forces. This broader range of campaigning resulted in a large rise in membership and a higher profile in the media. It campaigned for the retaining of the public right to petition the ECHR, its General Secretary Martin Loney writing to the Prime Minister, Edward Heath. However, Loney was controversially sacked by the executive of the NCCL led by its chair, Henry Hodge.

Opposition to racial discrimination

After 1960, NCCL responded to the tightening of immigration laws and a rise in race-hate incidents by lobbying for the Race Relations Act, which came into force in 1965. NCCL also published pamphlets exposing the effective 'colour bar', whereby black and Asian people were refused service in certain pubs and hotels.

Following Conservative MP Enoch Powell's Rivers of Blood speech in 1968 the NCCL set about organising an emergency "Speak out on Race" meeting and also presented an NCCL petition to the Prime Minister.

Women's rights

Campaigning for women's rights was also a major part of NCCL's work in this period, including successfully calling for reform of jury service laws that effectively prevented women and the poor from serving on juries by means of a property qualification.

Right to public protest

NCCL intervened on behalf of groups refused permission to protest and monitoring the policing of demonstrations such as those against the Vietnam War.

Support for reluctant servicemen

NCCL also campaigned to raise awareness of the difficulty faced by 'reluctant servicemen' – men in the armed forces who had often signed up as teenagers then realised they'd made a mistake but were prevented from discharging themselves for anything up to 16 years.

Northern Ireland

In 1972 NCCL campaigned for civil rights in Northern Ireland.

Data protection

In 1975 NCCL bought 3 million credit rating files from Konfax Ltd after they were offered for sale in the Evening Standard. The files were destroyed and the major privacy protection 'Right to Know' campaign to give individuals greater control over their personal information was launched in 1977.

=== 1975–1989 ===
Near the end of 1974, Patricia Hewitt, later a Labour cabinet minister, was appointed as general secretary. A number of other future high-profile Labour politicians worked at the organisation at this time, such as Harriet Harman, who worked as the legal officer from 1978 to 1982, Jack Dromey, later her husband, was a member (1970–79) and chairman of the executive committee, and Diane Abbott was employed as Race Relations Officer (1978–80).

Paedophilia

In 1976, the NCCL in a submission to the Criminal Law Revision Committee of the British Parliament argued that "Childhood sexual experiences, willingly engaged in, with an adult result in no identifiable damage… The real need is a change in the attitude which assumes that all cases of paedophilia result in lasting damage". The NCCL also sought to place the "onus of proof on the prosecution to show that the child was actually harmed" rather than having a blanket ban on child pornography and advocated the decriminalisation of incest. Organisations such as Paedophile Information Exchange (P.I.E.), a pro-paedophile activist group, and Paedophile Action for Liberation became affiliated to the pressure group. Prominent pro-paedophile activist Tom O'Carroll also sat on the NCCL's sub-committee for gay rights. Shami Chakrabarti, the former director of Liberty, issued an apology about the links between the NCCL and the PIE. In December 2013, she said: "It is a source of continuing disgust and horror that even the NCCL had to expel paedophiles from its ranks in 1983 after infiltration at some point in the 70s."

Gay rights and censorship

NCCL acted for the owners of Gay's the Word bookshop, whose stock was confiscated by Customs officers in 1984. All charges were dropped in 1986.

Miners' strike

During the miners' strike, NCCL campaigned on behalf of miners stopped from picketing outside their home regions.

MI5 surveillance

The European Court of Human Rights ruled that MI5 surveillance of Harriet Harman and Patricia Hewitt during the pair's tenure at Liberty breached the European Convention on Human Rights.

=== 1990–2004 ===
Detention without charge

During the Gulf War, Liberty successfully campaigned for the release of more than 100 Iraqi nationals – some of whom were openly opposed to Saddam Hussein – detained without charge in Britain on the grounds that they posed a risk to national security.

Miscarriage of justice

Throughout the 1990s Liberty focused again on miscarriage of justice cases and campaigned for reform of the criminal justice system. High-profile cases included that of the Birmingham Six, who were released after 16 years in prison for IRA bombings they did not commit.

Human Rights Act

At the start of the 2000s, Liberty used the protections in the new Human Rights Act 1998 to fight a number of landmark cases. Including supporting terminally ill Diane Pretty's fight to die with dignity and Christine Goodwin's fight for transgender rights.

A and others v Secretary of State for the Home Department

Liberty intervened in the long-running A and others v Secretary of State for the Home Department case following which the Law Lords ruled that detaining non-British nationals without trial was unlawful. In a 2005 judgment the Law Lords also confirmed that evidence obtained through torture was not admissible in British courts.

Katharine Gun

In 2004, Liberty acted for the translator and whistleblower Katharine Gun who claimed that the American National Security Agency had requested the British Government's help in illegal surveillance on the UN. She was prosecuted under the Official Secrets Act 1989. The charges were dropped when the prosecution failed to offer any evidence.

=== 2005–2014 ===
Pre-charge detention

During 2007 and 2008 Liberty led the opposition to government plans to extend detention without charge for those suspected of terrorism to 42 days. Chakrabarti and Liberty claimed a major campaign victory when the government dropped the proposal after it was rejected by the House of Lords in October 2008.

Gooch Gang

In April 2009, Liberty protested against a poster campaign by Greater Manchester Police which depicted a series of notorious Manchester gangsters, the Gooch Gang, as pensioners. The billboard campaign used computer-generated images of Colin Joyce and Lee Amos to show how the "aged" criminals would look when they are finally released from prison in the 2040s. Liberty supported claims that the posters should be removed following complaints from family members of the gangsters, not involved with their relatives' criminality, who claimed they were being targeted in the community after the posters were erected.

Cream of Conscience

November 2011 saw Liberty successfully assist in preventing Westminster City Council from implementing a proposed byelaw which would have essentially criminalised "soup runs" within areas of Southwark.

Freedom Games?

In response to the vast security systems which were put in place ahead of the London 2012 Olympic Games, Liberty raised concerns with regards to the infringements to civil liberties which would subsequently occur. Liberty argued that neither peaceful protest nor the right to free speech were a factor in ensuring the safety of the Games.

For their eyes only

Another prominent campaign in 2012 was "For their eyes only" in response to the proposed Justice and Security Bill which was introduced in the House of Lords on 28 May 2012. The Bill was introduced as a result of prolific media investigations and litigation surrounding the UK Government and proposed "secret courts" and evidence which would be non-disclosable. A campaign presence and attendance by Shami Chakrabarti at the Liberal Democrats Conference in September 2012 in Brighton successfully led to the passing of a motion by Jo Shaw, Liberal Democrat Parliamentary Spokesperson for Holborn and St Pancras, against the Bill. Nevertheless, the substantially unchanged Bill became law in April 2013.

Extradition Watch

A prominent campaign by Liberty was in relation to fairer extradition laws and the opposition of unfair extradition proceedings, the most prominent case being that of Gary McKinnon who gained worldwide press attention. Other prolific cases included that of Babar Ahmed, Talha Ahsan and Christopher Tappin.

Gary McKinnon

16 October 2012 saw a victory for Gary McKinnon, after a decade-long ordeal, as the Home Secretary, Theresa May, announced that she was refusing to allow Gary's extradition to the US on the basis that doing so would breach his Human Rights. Gary McKinnon was charged in 2002 of hacking into US military and NASA systems, but maintains that he was looking for UFOs and evidence of free energy suppression. Gary, who has Asperger syndrome, could have spent up to 70 years in a US jail if convicted and it was argued by his lawyers in an appeal to the European Court of Human Rights (ECHR) that because of this factor and because the crime was committed in the UK that he should be tried in the UK. Director of Liberty, Shami Chakrabarti said of the Home Secretary's decision "This is a great day for rights, freedoms and justice in the United Kingdom." The Home Office also admitted that it was the Human Rights Act which essentially prevented the extradition.

Gay rights

Liberty intervened in the case of gay couple Michael Black and John Morgan who were turned away from a bed and breakfast because of the owner's religious views. On 18 October 2012 it was ruled that the B&B owner was in breach of equality legislation by unlawfully discriminating against the couple on the basis of their sexual orientation. Liberty's Legal Director James Welch said of the decision "Hopefully today's ruling signals the death knell of such 'no gays' policies – policies that would never be tolerated if they referred to a person's race, gender or religion."

=== 2015 onwards ===
==== Save our Human Rights Act ====
Immediately following the 2015 general election result, Liberty launched a campaign to save the Human Rights Act. The Conservative Party – which had won a majority – had included a pledge in its manifesto to repeal the Act. Liberty called this "a knowing attempt by Government ministers to hand itself the right to end the universality of human rights and choose when and to whom they apply".

In May 2016, Liberty, Amnesty International UK and the British Institute of Human Rights published a statement opposing repeal of the Act, backed by more than 130 organisations including UK Families Flight 103, Friends of the Earth, Refuge, Quakers in Britain, Stonewall, the Terrence Higgins Trust, the Down's Syndrome Association and the Football Supporters' Federation.

In July 2015, Liberty coordinated an intervention from a number of former Anti-Apartheid campaigners including Archbishop Njongonkulu Ndungane and Denis Goldberg.

==== The Deepcut inquests ====
Liberty represented the families of three of the four young soldiers who died of gunshot wounds at Deepcut army barracks between 1995 and 2002 – Cheryl James, Sean Benton and James Collinson. Liberty used the Human Rights Act to compel Surrey Police to disclose evidence about the deaths to the families, which they were then able to use to apply for fresh inquests.

The second inquest into the death of Cheryl James took place at Woking Coroner's Court from January to April 2016. On 3 June 2016, Coroner Brian Barker QC recorded a verdict of suicide, delivering a narrative verdict that strongly condemned the culture at Deepcut. Following the verdict, Liberty called for reform to tackle the "pervasive sexualised culture" in the Armed Forces.

The second inquest into the death of Sean Benton took place from January to June 2018, in Woking. On 18 July 2018, Coroner Peter Rook QC recorded a verdict of suicide and again strongly criticised failings at Deepcut and in the Surrey Police investigation. Following the verdict, Liberty and Sean's family called for all serious crimes within the Armed Forces to be investigated by the civilian police, rather than the Royal Military Police.

==== Corporal Anne-Marie Ellement ====
Liberty represented the family of Corporal Anne-Marie Ellement, a Royal Military Police Office who took her own life in 2011 after alleging that she had been raped by two colleagues. The allegations were investigated by military police themselves, and no charges were brought.

An initial inquest in March 2012 recorded a verdict of suicide, but Anne-Marie's family, represented by Liberty, used the Human Rights Act to secure a second, more thorough inquest. They alleged that Anne-Marie had been bullied and that the Royal Military Police had failed in their duty of care.

On 3 July 2014, Nicholas Rheinberg – Coroner in the second inquest – ruled that bullying, the lingering effect of the alleged rape and "work-related despair" had contributed to Anne-Marie's suicide.

In 2013, Anne-Marie's family, represented by Liberty, also used the threat of legal action under the Human Rights Act to compel the Ministry of Defence and Royal Military Police to agree to refer the Anne-Marie's rape allegations for a fresh, independent investigation. This was carried out by RAF Police and Bedfordshire Police, overseen by the Crown Prosecution Service.

On 29 October 2015, the Service Prosecuting Authority announced that two former soldiers had been charged with raping Anne-Marie and stated that "the original decision by the SPA not to prosecute was 'wrong'". The two men were acquitted on 20 April 2016.

In October 2016, the Royal Military Police apologised to Anne-Marie's family for failings and mistakes in the original rape investigation.

In November 2017, the Ministry of Defence announced it would stop Commanding Officers investigating allegations of sexual assault themselves – a call Liberty had made from Corporal Ellement's 2014 inquest.

==== Mass surveillance ====
Following Edward Snowden's whistleblowing in 2013, mass surveillance became a major part of Liberty's work.

Shortly after the revelations, Liberty brought a legal challenge to the UK government's practices with a coalition of other organisations, including Amnesty International, Privacy International and ACLU. In September 2018, the European Court of Human Rights ruled that GCHQ's bulk interception practices had violated privacy rights and failed to provide sufficient safeguards.

In 2014, Liberty represented MPs David Davis and Tom Watson in a legal challenge to the Data Retention and Investigatory Powers Act (DRIPA), claiming that it breached privacy rights. The case was referred to the European Court of Justice (ECJ) by the Court of Appeal, and in December 2016 the ECJ ruled that the general and indiscriminate retention of emails and electronic communications by governments was illegal. In January 2018, the Court of Appeal found DRIPA unlawful.

Throughout 2016, Liberty campaigned against what it believed to be a serious lack of privacy safeguards in the Investigatory Powers Bill. The Bill passed in November 2016. In January 2017, Liberty launched a crowdfunder to raise funds to challenge the Act in the High Court, raising more than £53,000 in a week.

Liberty's challenge to various parts of the Investigatory Powers Act is ongoing. In April 2018, the High Court issued its ruling on the first part of the challenge, giving the government six months to rewrite core parts of the Act, which it found incompatible with EU law.

==== Equal pensions for same-sex couples ====
Liberty represented John Walker in a legal challenge to a loophole in the Equality Act which let employers exempt same-sex spouses from spousal pension benefits. Upon retirement from Innospec, John had discovered that his husband would only receive a few hundred pounds a year. If he were married to a woman, she would have received around £45,000.

In July 2017, the Supreme Court found the loophole unlawful under EU law.

==== Hostile environment policies ====
Liberty campaigned against the introduction of the 'hostile environment' policies and has since campaigned for their repeal. It has also campaigned against data-sharing arrangements between immigration enforcement and public services including hospitals, schools and police. In August 2017, Liberty exposed that the Home Office had secretly gained access to nationality data on homeless people in London.

==== Facial recognition ====
In June 2018, Liberty announced it would be representing Cardiff resident Ed Bridges in a legal challenge to South Wales Police's use of facial recognition technology in public spaces. Liberty argues that the technology "is dangerously inaccurate and has the potential to trample on the freedoms we all take for granted".

Immigration detention

In January 2017, Liberty launched a campaign calling for a 28-day statutory limit on immigration detention in the UK.

==== Rights to protest ====
Liberty has a campaign to defend the right to protest, including against new restrictions in the Public Order Act 2023 and related new law.

It took action against Home Office regulations that sought to redefine certain powers under the Public Order Act 1986, as recently amended by the Police, Crime, Sentencing and Courts Act 2022, to apply to "more than minor" disruption in protests rather than just to "serious disruption". The Home Office argued that the meaning of "more than minor" was compatible with "serious". In May 2025, the Court of Appeal ruled that the two regulations issued were unlawful, because these meanings were incompatible.

Liberty intervened in a 2025 court case challenging the banning of Palestine Action under anti-terrorism laws. It provided evidence that upholding the ban would undermine freedom of expression and allow peaceful protests to be criminalised.

== Organisation ==
Liberty is both a non-profit company that employs staff and runs campaigns, and a member-based association. Both work closely with the Civil Liberties Trust. Liberty is divided into three organisations:

- Liberty – an unincorporated association

A democratically run membership association, which individuals can join.

- Liberty – the company

A non-profit company that employs staff and runs campaigns etc. It leases buildings and works closely with the Civil Liberties Trust (see below).

- The Civil Liberties Trust

The Civil Liberties Trust (CLT) is a registered charity (No. 1024948), independent of Liberty. The CLT has no staff, but commissions Liberty to conduct charitable work such as providing public advice and information, as well as research, policy work, and litigation.

== Causes and associations ==
The main issues Liberty is campaigning on, as of 2018, include:

- Mass surveillance
- Police use of facial recognition and other intrusive surveillance technology such as IMSI catchers
- Human rights in the UK after Brexit
- Hostile environment policies and public service data-sharing with UK immigration enforcement
- Soldiers' rights, in particularly campaigning for an overhaul of the military justice system
- Immigration detention
- Public spaces protection orders

In addition, Liberty campaigns on a number of 'core' issues that remain constant:

- Torture
- Privacy
- Free speech
- Equality
- Protest rights
- Policing

== General secretaries and directors ==
1932: Ronald Kidd
1942: Elizabeth Acland Allen
1960: Martin Ennals
1966: Tony Smythe
1973: Martin Loney
1974: Patricia Hewitt
1984: Larry Gostin
1985: Sarah Spencer
1989: Andrew Puddephatt
1995: John Wadham
2003: Shami Chakrabarti
2016: Martha Spurrier
2024: Akiko Hart

== Publications ==
Liberty produces briefings on its campaign issues, as well as researching and writing reports on particular areas of human rights and civil liberties.

=== Reports ===
- A Guide to the Hostile Environment: The border controls dividing our communities and how we can bring them down. April 2018.
- Bringing human rights home? What's at stake for rights in the incorporation of EU law after Brexit. February 2018.
- Military Justice: Proposals for a fair and independent military justice system. June 2014. ISBN 978-0-946088-62-1
- A Journalist's Guide to the Human Rights Act. January 2011. ISBN 978-0-946088-60-7
- Parliamentarian's Guide to the Human Rights Act (PDF) (Report). September 2010. ISBN 978-0-946088-58-4.
- Common Sense - Reflections on the HRA book (PDF) (Report). June 2010. ISBN 978-0-946088-57-7.
- Comparative Law Study - Pre-charge Detention (PDF) (Report). July 2010. Archived from the original (PDF) on 14 March 2012.
- a Manifesto for Justice (PDF) (Report). the Bar Council. December 2009.
- Churchill's Legacy - the Conservative Case for the HRA (PDF) (Report). October 2009. ISBN 978-0-946088-56-0. Archived from the original (PDF) on 28 July 2013.
- Overlooked: Surveillance and personal privacy in modern Britain (PDF) (Report). December 2007. Archived from the original (PDF) on 6 August 2012.
- Setting the record straight: the Dangers of 'Off the Record' Briefings to the Media During Police Counter-Terrorist Operations (PDF) (Report). May 2007.
- Litigating the Public Interest, July 2006
- Twelve Point Terror Package Initial Thoughts, August 2005
- Prevention of Terrorism Act 2005 summary
- Impact of Anti-Terror Measures on British Muslims, June 2004
- ID Card Bill key points, 2004
- A New 'Suspect Community', October 2003
- Rights of victims of crime, February 2003
- Magistrates Court Review, February 2003
- Casualty of War – Counter Terror Legislation in Rural England, 2003
- An Independent Police Complaints Commission, April 2000

=== Policy Papers ===
Being a cross-party, non-party political organisation, Liberty regularly publishes briefings to MPs and peers, to provide consultation to parliamentary committees and to respond to consultations on issues relating to human rights and civil liberties in the UK.

== See also ==
- American Civil Liberties Union, an American equivalent
- Civil libertarianism
- Convention on Modern Liberty
- NO2ID
- On Liberty (Chakrabarti book)
