= 2008 Haltemprice and Howden by-election =

2008 UK Parliamentary by-election

- 10 July 2008

Haltemprice and Howden constituency
- Turnout: 34%
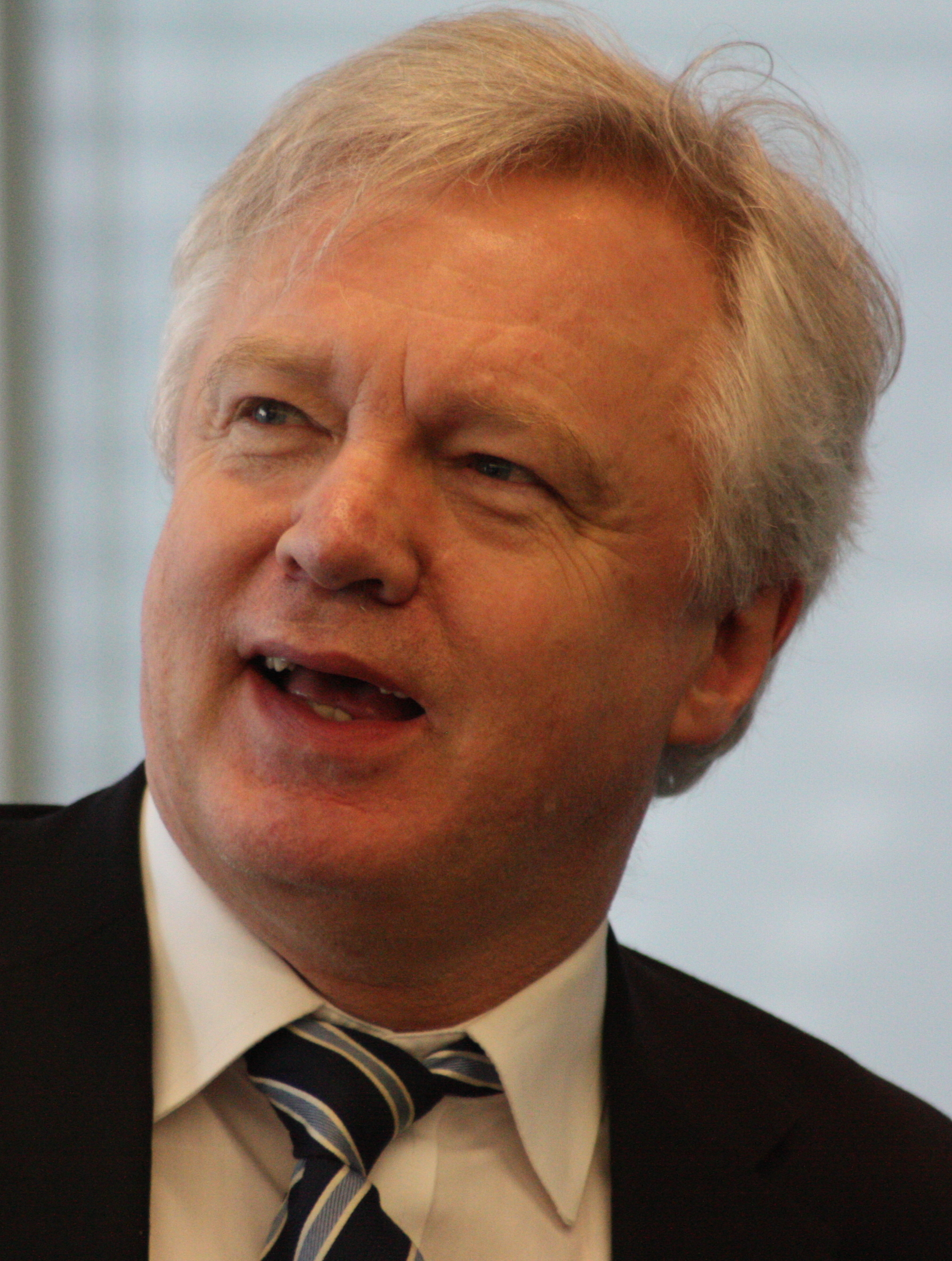
	First party	Second party	Third party
		GPEW	ED
Candidate	David Davis	Shan Oakes	Joanne Robinson
Party	Conservative	Green	English Democrat
Popular vote	17,113	1,758	1,714
Percentage	71.6%	7.4%	7.2%
Swing	▲24.1%	New party	New party
MP before election
David Davis
Conservative
Elected MP
David Davis
Conservative

A by-election for the United Kingdom parliamentary constituency of Haltemprice and Howden was held on 10 July 2008, triggered by the surprise resignation of incumbent Conservative Party MP David Davis in order to re-contest the seat. Davis comfortably held his seat with a 15,355-vote majority. Due to the unusual circumstances, the by-election held several by-election records, including for the largest number of candidates running in a UK parliamentary by-election (26) and the largest number of independent candidates, until both were broken at the 2026 Clacton by-election.

Davis' stated intention was to spark a wider public debate on the perceived erosion of civil liberties in the UK, launched as the David Davis for Freedom campaign. The two other major political parties, Labour and the Liberal Democrats, both declined to field candidates; the Liberal Democrats as they supported Davis in this issue and Labour as they considered the by-election to be a "political stunt".

Davis was subsequently re-elected to his seat as a Conservative with 72% of the vote. He received 17,113 votes, with the closest challenge coming from the Green Party and the English Democrats with 1,758 and 1,714 votes respectively. All other candidates lost their deposit due to polling less than 5% of the vote. This was, at the time, the best by-election results for both the Greens and the English Democrats.

Davis's attempted use of a by-election to be framed around a single-issue in this way attracted both praise and criticism from politicians, the public and the media, with The Sun newspaper initially considering fielding a candidate to oppose Davis in support of anti-terrorism legislation. The Labour Party's non-participation attracted criticism as appearing to be afraid to debate, following recent poor local election results and record low opinion poll results; while Davis attracted criticism for being vain, wasting public money, and contesting the issue in a safe seat for the Conservatives.

== Background ==
Location of Haltemprice and Howden within Humberside

=== Constituency ===
The UK Parliament constituency of Haltemprice and Howden was located in the East Riding of Yorkshire. The seat was split evenly between residential and rural areas, stretching from the border of Kingston upon Hull in the east to Howden in the west and northwards to the village of Holme-on-Spalding-Moor. Most of the population was centred in the villages of Willerby, Kirk Ella, Anlaby and Cottingham, which were part of the former district of Haltemprice.

=== Campaign ===
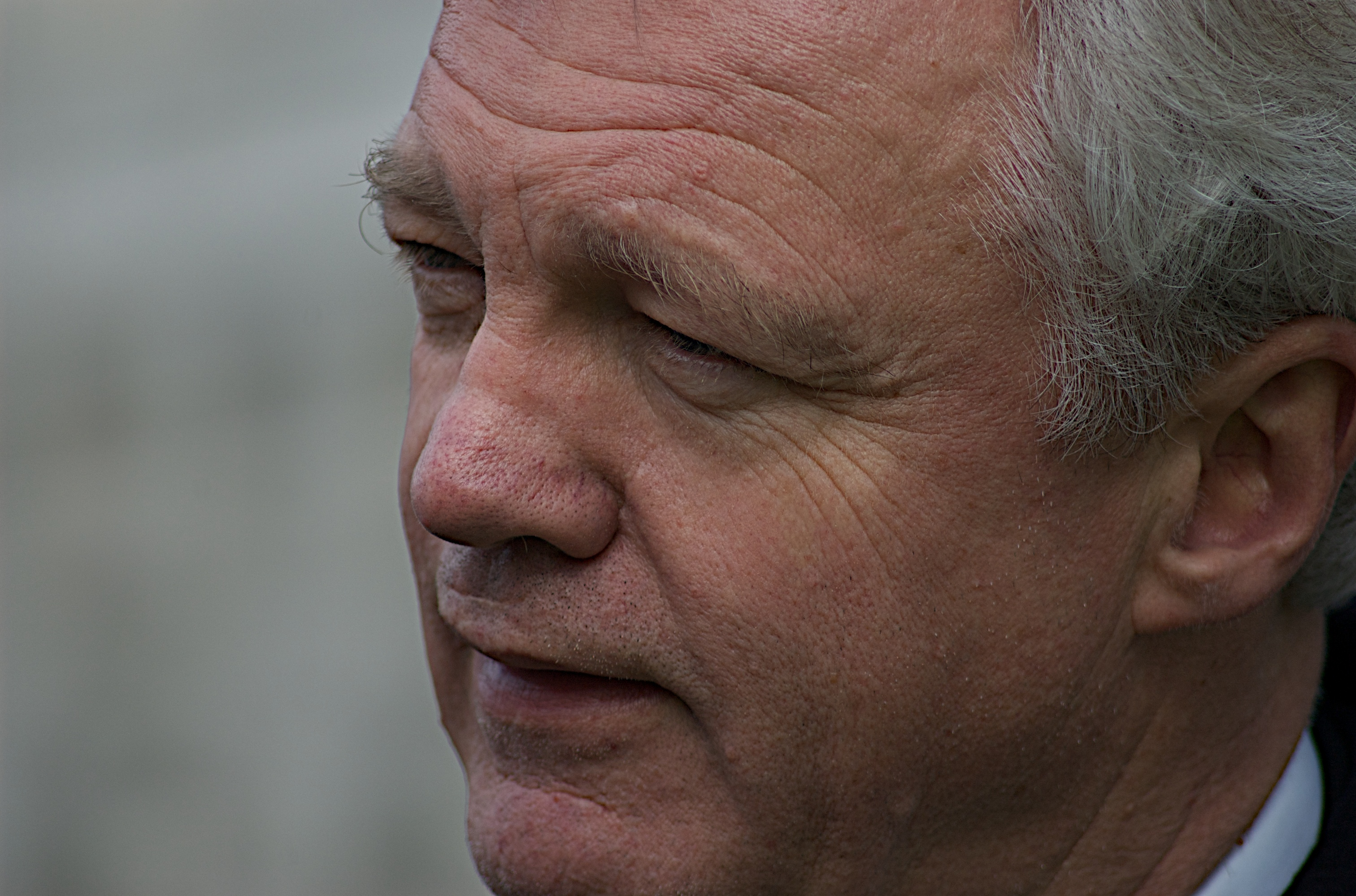
David Davis in 2008

Conservative MP David Davis, the then Shadow Home Secretary, announced his intention to resign from the House of Commons on 12 June 2008, a day after the Counter-Terrorism Act 2008, which would extend the legal detention of terror suspects without charge to a maximum of 42 days, passed. Davis stated he intended to spark a wider public debate about the perceived erosion of civil liberties by the Brown ministry, which in the following week was launched as the 'David Davis for Freedom campaign'. Culture Secretary Andy Burnham called on Davis to fund the cost of the by-election to the taxpayer, estimated at £80,000, from his own pocket.

Davis had held the seat as a Conservative since its creation in 1997, having previously been MP since 1987 for the predecessor seat of Boothferry. The Conservative position at the time of Davis's resignation aligned with Davis in opposing the 42-day extension vote, although his decision to resign was not endorsed by Conservative leader David Cameron.

The by-election followed both a heavy defeat for Labour in the 2008 Crewe and Nantwich by-election at the hands of the Conservatives and a failed attempt by the Liberal Democrats to unseat Davis in 2005 as part of a broader "decapitation" strategy targeting prominent Conservatives.

=== Analogous UK parliamentary elections ===
A small number of previous by-elections had been initiated when the sitting MP resigned on a point of principle and stood for immediate re-election. This had previously occurred on three occasions since the Second World War: the Lincoln by-election in 1973 and the Mitcham and Morden by-election in 1982 (when the sitting MPs changed parties), and in 1986 when fifteen Northern Irish unionist MPs resigned in protest against the Anglo-Irish Agreement. In addition, in 1955 Richard Acland had resigned with the intention to re-contest Gravesend as an independent in protest against the Labour Party's support for nuclear weapons, but the 1955 general election overtook events and he lost.

At the 1997 general election, neither Labour nor the Liberal Democrats stood against Conservative Neil Hamilton, who had been implicated in the cash-for-questions affair, in the seat of Tatton, instead urging their supporters to back independent Martin Bell; Bell won the seat. In both 2001 and 2005, the Liberal Democrats did not field a candidate in Wyre Forest, instead supporting the successful campaigns of Health Concern candidate Richard Taylor.

== Result ==
Polling took place on 10 July 2008.

2008 Haltemprice and Howden by-election
Party	Candidate	Votes	%	±%
Conservative	David Davis	17,113	71.6	▲24.1
Green	Shan Oakes	1,758	7.4	N/A
English Democrat	Joanne Robinson	1,714	7.2	N/A
National Front	Tess Culnane	544	2.3	N/A
Miss Great Britain Party	Gemma Garrett	521	2.2	N/A
Independent	Jill Saward	492	2.1	N/A
Monster Raving Loony	Mad Cow-Girl	412	1.7	N/A
Independent	Walter Sweeney	238	1.0	N/A
Independent	John Nicholson	162	0.7	N/A
Independent	David Craig	135	0.6	N/A
New Party	David Pinder	135	0.6	N/A
No description	David Icke	110	0.5	N/A
Freedom 4 Choice	Hamish Howitt	91	0.4	N/A
Socialist Equality	Chris Talbot	84	0.4	N/A
Independent	Grace Astley	77	0.3	N/A
Christian	George Hargreaves	76	0.3	N/A
Church of the Militant Elvis	David Bishop	44	0.2	N/A
Independent	John Upex	38	0.2	N/A
Independent	Greg Wood	32	0.1	N/A
Independent	Eamonn Fitzpatrick	31	0.1	N/A
Make Politicians History	Ronnie Carroll	29	0.1	N/A
Independent	Thomas Darwood	25	0.1	N/A
Independent	Christopher Foren	23	0.1	N/A
Independent	Herbert Crossman	11	0.0	N/A
Independent	Tony Farnon	8	0.0	N/A
Independent	Norman Scarth	8	0.0	N/A
Majority		15,355	64.2	▲53.5
Turnout		23,911	34.5	▼35.7
Conservative hold		Swing		

== Candidates ==
The East Riding of Yorkshire Council announced the accepted candidates on 26 June 2008. At 26, the number of candidates broke the record for a UK parliamentary by-election, previously held by the 1993 Newbury by-election, which had 19 candidates. The greatest number of candidates to have contested a UK general election seat is 15, at Sedgefield in 2005.

Due to the large number of candidates the ballot paper for this election was arranged in two columns. Also, the candidates stood in a line in front of a small platform with the returning officer on it, rather than on a temporary stage as is normally practised because it was feared that the stage would not take the weight of all the candidates.

=== Christian Party ===
George Hargreaves stood for the Christian Party and was leader of that party. The party website said "he is asking the Haltemprice and Howden electorate to use their vote to demand a referendum on the European Union, which he believes is the greatest threat to our civil liberties".

=== Church of the Militant Elvis Party ===
David Bishop was the candidate for the Church of the Militant Elvis Party. He previously stood for this party in Erewash in the 2005 general election and in Brentwood and Ongar in 2001.

=== Conservative ===
David Davis, whose resignation triggered the by-election, stood as the official Conservative Party candidate. He fought the campaign on the theme David Davis for Freedom.

=== English Democrats Party ===
The English Democrats selected Joanne Robinson as its candidate. She previously stood as the UK Independence Party candidate for the same constituency in the 2001 general election.

=== Freedom 4 Choice ===
Hamish Howitt was one of two pub landlords who announced intentions to stand under the "Freedom to Choose" label, opposing the smoking ban in England.

=== Green Party ===
Shan Oakes was the Green Party candidate. She was also a candidate for the party in the 2009 European Parliament elections.

She stood on a civil rights platform, highlighting the measures supported by Davis that she claimed threaten civil liberties, including his support for the death penalty. Davis considered Oakes his most serious opponent.

=== Make Politicians History ===
Ronnie Carroll, standing for Make Politicians History, was the party's leader and also a twice-defeated Eurovision Song Contest entrant. He stood in Hampstead and Highgate in the 1997 general election for the "Rainbow Dream Ticket", a predecessor of "Make Politicians History", and in the 1997 Uxbridge by-election for the ProLife Alliance. He told the VoteWise website he stands for liberating "ourselves from the governing classes, those lords of misrule".

=== Miss Great Britain Party ===
The Miss Great Britain Party candidate was Gemma Garrett, following her last place, as an independent, at the earlier Crewe and Nantwich by-election. The party registered with the Electoral Commission after that election. Garrett expressed opposition to David Davis, declaring herself "happy to be locked up for 42 days if I am a suspect".

=== National Front ===
Tess Culnane was the National Front candidate; she was a 2004 London Assembly election candidate for the British National Party and a 2008 London Assembly election candidate for the National Front.

=== The New Party ===
David Pinder stood for The New Party. He said "Read my lips: what David Davis is saying is that Britain needs a new party".

=== Official Monster Raving Loony Party ===
The Official Monster Raving Loony Party's candidate was Rosalyn Warner, known as Mad Cow-Girl. She stood on an indefinite-detention platform, combined with a quote based on Douglas Adams's "Hitchhikers Guide to the Galaxy": "The answer is 42!!! Now we just need to figure out the real question!!!" On BBC Radio 4, they were reported as saying 'because the sensible parties are acting like lunatics in this election, we have decided to come up with sensible policies'. Later she remarked "I may be a loony but I'm not mad enough to want dangerous people to be walking the streets" She has previously stood in Sunderland South in the 2001 and 2005 general elections.

=== Socialist Equality Party ===
The Socialist Equality Party stood Chris Talbot as its candidate on a programme of "genuine" socialism with a particular emphasis on a defence of "democratic rights". He is a lecturer at the University of Huddersfield and contested South Wales Central in the 2007 National Assembly for Wales election.

=== Independent candidates ===
- David Craig (real name Neil Glass), former management consultant turned author critical of Gordon Brown stood as an independent candidate.
- Herbert Crossman stood in Harrow West in the 1997 general election for the Referendum Party. Crossman told the VoteWise website he wants to "make a difference to people's life's." {sic}
- Thomas Darwood has letters published on the themes of monarchy and religion on his web site.
- Tony Farnon told the VoteWise website his campaign was largely based on his personal anti-smoking and smoking addiction programme, and that smokers could use his "Winners Freedom Secrets".
- Eamonn Fitzpatrick, a Northampton market trader, stated that he would shut down his market stall for a month to campaign in favour of the government's 42-day detention plan. Fitzpatrick has run in elections before, standing in Northampton South. Kelvin MacKenzie urged his supporters and those in favour of 42 days detention to vote for Fitzpatrick. He received 31 votes
- Christopher Foren was the Leeds Crown Prosecutor.
- Jill Saward, a campaigner for rape law reform, stated in an article on her website that she would stand as a candidate against David Davis, in response to Davis "saying nothing at all" about sexual violence issues while serving as Shadow Home Secretary. She stated that the DNA Database should be extended to help detection of sexual assault, and that there was a disparity between the "thousands" of people affected by sexual assault each year, compared to the detention proposals of the Counter-Terrorism Bill which "may not affect anyone at all". In the early hours of 26 June she revealed that she would be standing in the election and later that afternoon she confirmed that her nomination papers had been accepted.
- Norman Scarth stood as "Anti Crime" in the 2007 Sedgefield by-election, where he came bottom of the poll with 34 votes. He had previously contested Chesterfield in the 1997 general election, as "Independent Old Age Pensioner"
- Walter Sweeney is the former Conservative MP for Vale of Glamorgan
- John Upex is a former UK Independence Party (UKIP) member, and was UKIP candidate in Wakefield in the 2005 general election
- Greg Wood had served as a doctor with the Royal Navy for sixteen years. His candidature was on the single issue of better care for the armed forces and veterans

=== Candidate with no ballot paper description ===
Conspiracy theorist David Icke said he would stand for election under the slogan "Big Brother – the Big Picture", but that if elected he would refuse to take the oath of allegiance to the Queen in order to take up his seat. He opted to declare neither a party affiliation nor "Independent", so appeared on the ballot paper with no party label. Icke told the VoteWise website he had "no politics", and David Davis had a "lot he doesn't yet see".

== Not standing ==
=== Liberal Democrats ===
Nick Clegg, the leader of the Liberal Democrats, announced that his party would not field a candidate in the by-election as the Liberal Democrats supported Davis's position on civil liberties, but he said that the party intended to contest the seat as normal at the next general election. The Liberal Democrats came second in the 2005 and 2010 general elections in this seat and fourth in the 2015 general election.

=== Labour Party ===
The Labour Party also declared that it would not contest the by-election. In the immediate aftermath of Davis's decision, Prime Minister Gordon Brown called the by-election a "farce", and Home Secretary Jacqui Smith said the Conservative Party was in "disarray". In a statement on the Labour Party's website, NEC Chair Dianne Hayter, said: "This is a phoney by-election that is completely unnecessary and the Labour Party will not be taking part in what is a political stunt".

=== UK Independence Party ===
The UK Independence Party (UKIP) did not contest the election. However, one UKIP MEP announced that he would campaign for David Davis if he also addressed issues related to the European Union during his campaign.

=== British National Party ===
The British National Party published that it foresaw the "possible...splintering" of the Conservatives, it supported Davis on "traditional British civil liberties", and on those two grounds, would not run.

=== News Corp ===
The editor of The Sun newspaper, Rebekah Wade and its proprietor Rupert Murdoch requested in the immediate days following Davis's decision that columnist Kelvin MacKenzie stand against Davis for election. MacKenzie stated "The Sun is very, very hostile to David Davis because of his 28-day stance and The Sun has always been very up for 42 days and perhaps even 420 days." In its editorial The Sun described Davis as deranged. MacKenzie said on 19 June 2008 that he would not be standing, primarily due to having no financial backing. He urged people to vote instead for Eamonn Fitzpatrick.

== History ==
=== Constituency history ===
Davis held the seat, as a Conservative, since its creation in 1997, and held the predecessor seat of Boothferry from 1987. Its area has been covered by parts of (and partly at different times) by Boothferry, Howden, Haltemprice, Howdenshire and East Riding of Yorkshire, has been consistently represented by Conservative MPs since the 1837 general election.

Davis's majority fell to 4.3% in the 2001 general election; the seat became a Liberal Democrat target. Davis increased his majority to 10.7% in the 2005 general election.

General election 2005: Haltemprice and Howden
Party	Candidate	Votes	%	±%
Conservative	David Davis	22,792	47.5	+4.3
Liberal Democrats	Jon Neal	17,676	36.8	−2.1
Labour	Edward Hart	6,104	12.7	−3.0
BNP	John Mainprize	798	1.7	N/A
UKIP	Philip Lane	659	1.4	−0.8
Majority		5,116	10.7	+6.4
Turnout		48,029	70.1	+4.3
Conservative hold		Swing	+3.2	

=== By-election records ===
The nature of Davis's resignation resulted in a number of by-election records and unusual occurrences. Most notably, at 26, the election saw a record number of candidates and a record number of independent candidates standing for an election in the UK. 23 of them, including all independents, lost their deposit, also a record. All three records stood for 18 years, until being broken at the 2026 Clacton by-election.

The Labour Party's decision not to put forward a candidate meant this was the first Great British by-election since the Bristol South East in 1963 (in which the Conservative Party did not stand) in which the governing party has not stood a candidate and the first Great British by-election without a Labour candidate since the 1946 Combined English Universities by-election.

Davis's result saw the biggest increase in share of the vote, up 24.1%, for a Conservative by-election candidate since 1945. The Green Party and the English Democrats Party both gained record high by-election vote percentages at 7.4% and 7.2%, and second and third place respectively. This is also the highest percentage vote for the English Democrats at any parliamentary election.

== See also ==
- 2026 Clacton by-election
