= Mad Cow-Girl =

British nurse and politician (1961–2010)

Personal details
- Born: Rosalyn Warner; 1961 Harwich, Essex, England
- Died: 4 July 2010 (aged 48–49) Sunderland, England
- Party: Monster Raving Loony Party
- Occupation: Intensive care unit nurse

Rosalyn Warner (1961 – 4 July 2010), better known as Mad Cow-Girl, was a British nurse who contested several elections as a candidate for the Official Monster Raving Loony Party. She ran for election to the House of Commons for the Haltemprice and Howden seat in 2008 against incumbent Conservative MP David Davis, where she polled 412 votes (a vote that David Davis won comfortably).

== Background ==
Warner's involvement with the OMRLP began in 1997 when she met Screaming Lord Sutch, and she subsequently stood as a candidate in both local and general elections from 2004 to 2008. She also stood for election under the name The Mad Cow-Girl Warner. Mad Cow-Girl held numerous positions within the Monster Raving Loony Party, including Party Secretary, Campaigns Officer, Party Archivist, and Shadow Minister for around the world in Eighty Days. She stood at the 2001 and 2005 General Elections for the party in the first constituency to declare: Sunderland South. According to one journalist: "she triumphantly succeeded in maintaining the party's fine tradition of making an absolute mockery of the proceedings, spoiling the perfect picture of democracy at its noblest moment". In 2005, she appeared in national newspapers alongside then Prime Minister Tony Blair during the Sedgefield count. In 2006, she stood successfully for the board of a Hendon regeneration project, beating a British National Party candidate. Originally from Essex, she lived in Wearside for 10 years, and worked as an intensive care nurse at Sunderland Royal Hospital.

After a two-week visit to a friend in Sunderland I quickly decided that the friendliness and hospitality of the people up in the North East of England was my kind of society. The north-south divide does exist in my opinion – the north being a much more pleasant place to live.

— Mad Cow-Girl, quoted by the Sunderland Echo, 19 June 2008

== Haltemprice and Howden byelection, 2008 candidacy ==
We like to have fun when we go to elections...That's what we're in it for. But on this occasion it seems that the sensible candidate is acting like a loony, so it's up to the Loony Party to try and act sensibly. What a topsy-turvy world we live in.

— Mad Cow-Girl, Sunderland Echo.

Warner was one of 26 candidates standing in the 2008 Haltemprice and Howden by-election for the seat of Conservative MP David Davis. In a statement made to the media, she stated on the issue of detaining terrorist suspects for 42 days: "I may be a Loony, but I'm not mad enough to want dangerous people walking free in the name of political correctness." Warner argued for the extension of the time-limit for which terrorist suspects can be detained without charge and also argued against civil libertarians who opposed the 42-day limit. She stood on an indefinite-detention platform, combined with a quote based on Douglas Adams's "Hitchhikers Guide to the Galaxy": "The answer is 42!!! Now we just need to figure out the real question!!!"

Warner positioned herself as tough on terrorism in the run up to the by-election in order to appeal to the voters of the predominantly conservative seat. In one interview she asked: "Why don't decent citizens have a 'human right' not be assaulted, blown up or harassed, when the criminals can scream human rights if their handcuffs hurt?"

The high-profile nature of the by election has led to Warner's candidature being announced on several news sites. The Daily Record consider the fact that only Warner and possibly one other candidate will stand means that the by-election has descended into a farce. The Daily Record have endorsed Warner's candidacy on this account:

The poor folk of Haltemprice and Howden should show their contempt by giving the polls a bodyswerve.

But if they must vote in this unnecessary £100,000 waste of time, we say: Vote Cow-Girl.

OK, her track record's not great. She only polled 149 votes at the last general election in Sunderland South. And she wasn't much help to Nick The Flying Brick in the Crewe and Nantwich by-election last month.

But, crucially, she's not as discredited as David Davis. Or MacKenzie, for that matter.

— The Daily Record, 14 June 2008

The Independent suggested that Warner was chosen as the candidate because another candidate Banana Man would be contesting the Henley By-Election as a result of Boris Johnson resigning his Henley seat on becoming Mayor of London.

== Electoral history ==
=== Haltemprice and Howden ===
Haltemprice and Howden by-election, 2008
Party	Candidate	Votes	%	±%
Conservative	David Davis	17,113	71.6	▲24.1
Green	Shan Oakes	1,758	7.4	N/A
English Democrat	Joanne Robinson	1,714	7.2	N/A
National Front	Tess Culnane	544	2.3	N/A
Miss Great Britain Party	Gemma Garrett	521	2.2	N/A
Independent	Jill Saward	492	2.1	N/A
Monster Raving Loony	Mad Cow-Girl	412	1.7	N/A
Independent	Walter Sweeney	238	1.0	N/A
Independent	John Nicholson	162	0.7	N/A
Independent	David Craig	135	0.6	N/A
New Party	David Pinder	135	0.6	N/A
no label	David Icke	110	0.5	N/A
Freedom 4 Choice	Hamish Howitt	91	0.4	N/A
Socialist Equality	Chris Talbot	84	0.4	N/A
Independent	Grace Astley	77	0.3	N/A
Christian	George Hargreaves	76	0.3	N/A
Church of the Militant Elvis	David Bishop	44	0.2	N/A
Independent	John Upex	38	0.2	N/A
Independent	Greg Wood	32	0.1	N/A
Independent	Eamonn Fitzpatrick	31	0.1	N/A
Make Politicians History	Ronnie Carroll	29	0.1	N/A
Independent	Thomas Darwood	25	0.1	N/A
Independent	Christopher Foren	23	0.1	N/A
Independent	Herbert Crossman	11	0.0	N/A
Independent	Tony Farnon	8	0.0	N/A
Independent	Norman Scarth	8	0.0	N/A
Majority		15,355	64.2	▲53.5
Turnout		23,911	34.5	▼35.7
Conservative hold		Swing	N/A	

=== 2006 council elections ===
Local council elections 2006: Sunderland, Hendon Ward
Party	Candidate	Votes	%	±%
Labour	Mary Smith	1,062		
BNP	David Guynan	534		
Conservative	Alistar Newton	528		
Liberal Democrats	John Jackson	361		
Monster Raving Loony	Mad Cow-Girl	48		

=== 2005 general election ===
General election 2005: Sunderland South
Party	Candidate	Votes	%	±%
Labour	Chris Mullin	17,982		
Conservative	Robert Oliver	6,923		
Liberal Democrats	Gareth Kane	4,492		
BNP	David Guynan	1,166		
Monster Raving Loony	Mad Cow-Girl	149		

=== 2001 general election ===
Warner gained 291 votes or 0.9% of the total turnout.

General election 2001: Sunderland South
Party	Candidate	Votes	%	±%
Labour	Chris Mullin	19,921		
Conservative	Jim Boyd	6,254		
Liberal Democrats	Mark Greenfield	3,675		
BNP	Joseph Doble	576		
UKIP	Joseph Moore	470		
Monster Raving Loony	Mad Cow-Girl	291		
Majority				

=== 2000 council elections ===
Local council elections 2000: Sunderland, Hendon Ward
Party	Candidate	Votes	%	±%
Conservative	Janice Morrissey	1,213		
Labour	Gilian Gailbraith	1,082		
Monster Raving Loony	Mad Cow-Girl	108		
BNP	David Guynan	82		

== See also ==
- Sunderland South (UK Parliament constituency)
- Official Monster Raving Loony Party
