= Haltemprice and Howden =

UK Parliament constituency (1997–2024)

- Former county constituency for the House of Commons
- 2010–2024 boundary of Haltemprice and Howden in former county of Humberside

- Location of former county of Humberside within England
- County: East Riding of Yorkshire
- Electorate: 70,252 (December 2019)

1997–2024
- Seats: One
- Created from: Beverley; Boothferry
- Replaced by: Goole and Pocklington; Kingston upon Hull West and Haltemprice (part); Kingston upon Hull North and Cottingham (part)

Haltemprice and Howden was a constituency (Note: A county constituency (for the purposes of election expenses and type of returning officer)) in the East Riding of Yorkshire from 1997 to 2024. (Note: As with all constituencies, the constituency elects one Member of Parliament (MP) by the first past the post system of election at least every five years.)

The seat was abolished for the 2024 general election.

== Members of Parliament ==
Election	Member	Party
1997	David Davis	Conservative
2024	Constituency abolished	

== Constituency profile ==
The Electoral Reform Society considers it to be historically the safest seat in the country, after North Shropshire was lost to the Liberal Democrats in 2021. Taking into account the previous seats roughly covering its boundaries, the Society considers that the seat has been held continuously by the Conservative Party since the 1837 general election.

== Boundaries ==
Map of 2010–2024 boundaries

The constituency was named after the region of Haltemprice and covered a large, wide area stretching from the border of Hull in the east to Howden in the west and northwards to Holme-on-Spalding-Moor towards York in the Yorkshire Wolds. The bulk of the population is centred in the urban villages of Willerby, Kirk Ella, Anlaby and Cottingham, which were part of the former district of Haltemprice, which was abolished in 1974. Rural Howdenshire formed the bulk of the geographical area of the constituency but provides only a small part of the total electorate.

The constituency included many towns and villages along the A63 corridor including, Brough, Elloughton, South Cave, North Ferriby, Swanland, Gilberdyke, Newport, Welton and Melton.

1997–2010: The Borough of Boothferry wards of East Derwent, East Howdenshire, Gilberdyke, Holme upon Spalding Moor, Howden, Mid Howdenshire, and North Cave, and the East Yorkshire Borough of Beverley wards of Anlaby, Brough, Castle, Kirk Ella, Mill Beck and Croxby, Priory, Skidby and Rowley, South Cave, Springfield, Swanland, and Willerby.

2010–2024: The District of East Riding of Yorkshire wards of Cottingham North, Cottingham South, Dale, Howden, Howdenshire, South Hunsley, Tranby, and Willerby and Kirk Ella.

== History ==
The constituency was created for the 1997 general election, covering an area previously part of the Beverley and Boothferry constituencies. In 1997, it returned the Conservative David Davis, who had previously been the member for Boothferry; he was re-elected in the 2001, 2005 and 2010 general elections.

The area was placed as 10th most affluent in the country in the 2003 Barclays Private Clients survey. Election results but one to date suggest a Safe seat, with the 2001 result being an exception when the Conservative majority was cut to less than 2,000 votes. However, no party has come as near since then.

=== 2008 by-election ===
On 12 June 2008, a day after a vote on the extension of detention of terror suspects without charge, in an unexpected move, Davis took the Chiltern Hundreds, effectively resigning his seat as the constituency's MP. He stated this was to force a by-election, in which he intended to provoke a wider public debate on the single issue of the perceived erosion of civil liberties. Over the course of the following week, the campaign was launched on the theme of David Davis for Freedom.

Davis formally resigned as an MP on 18 June 2008, and the by-election took place on 10 July 2008, which Davis won.

=== Abolition in 2024 ===
Further to the completion of the 2023 Periodic Review of Westminster constituencies, the seat contents proposed to be distributed three ways:

- Howden and North Ferriby, with rural areas in between, to the successor constituency of Goole and Pocklington
- Cottingham to Kingston upon Hull North (to be renamed Kingston upon Hull North and Cottingham)
- Anlaby, Willerby and Kirk Ella to Kingston upon Hull West and Hessle (to be renamed Kingston upon Hull West and Haltemprice)

The constituency was abolished for the 2024 general election.

== Election results 1997–2024 ==
=== Elections in the 1990s ===
General election 1997: Haltemprice and Howden
Party	Candidate	Votes	%	±%
Conservative	David Davis	21,809	44.0	
Liberal Democrats	Diana Wallis	14,295	28.8	
Labour	George McManus	11,701	23.6	
Referendum	Trevor Pearson	1,370	2.8	
UKIP	Godfrey Bloom	301	0.6	
Natural Law	Barry Stevens	74	0.1	
Majority		7,514	15.2	
Turnout		49,550	75.5	
Conservative win (new seat)				

=== Elections in the 2000s ===
General election 2001: Haltemprice and Howden
Party	Candidate	Votes	%	±%
Conservative	David Davis	18,994	43.2	−0.8
Liberal Democrats	Jon Neal	17,091	38.9	+10.1
Labour	Leslie Howell	6,898	15.7	−7.9
UKIP	Joanne Robinson	945	2.2	+1.6
Majority		1,903	4.3	−10.9
Turnout		43,928	65.8	−9.7
Conservative hold		Swing	−5.4	

General election 2005: Haltemprice and Howden
Party	Candidate	Votes	%	±%
Conservative	David Davis	22,792	47.5	+4.3
Liberal Democrats	Jon Neal	17,676	36.8	−2.1
Labour	Edward Hart	6,104	12.7	−3.0
BNP	John Mainprize	798	1.7	New
UKIP	Philip Lane	659	1.4	−0.8
Majority		5,116	10.7	+6.4
Turnout		48,029	70.1	+4.3
Conservative hold		Swing	+3.2	

By-election 2008: Haltemprice and Howden
Party	Candidate	Votes	%	±%
Conservative	David Davis	17,113	71.6	+24.1
Green	Shan Oakes	1,758	7.4	New
English Democrat	Joanne Robinson	1,714	7.2	New
National Front	Tess Culnane	544	2.3	New
Miss Great Britain Party	Gemma Garrett	521	2.2	New
Independent	Jill Saward	492	2.1	New
Monster Raving Loony	Mad Cow-Girl	412	1.7	New
Independent	Walter Sweeney	238	1.0	New
Independent	John Nicholson	162	0.7	New
Independent	David Craig	135	0.6	New
New Party	David Pinder	135	0.6	New
no label	David Icke	110	0.5	New
Freedom 4 Choice	Hamish Howitt	91	0.4	New
Socialist Equality	Chris Talbot	84	0.4	New
Independent	Grace Astley	77	0.3	New
Christian	George Hargreaves	76	0.3	New
Church of the Militant Elvis	David Bishop	44	0.2	New
Independent	John Upex	38	0.2	New
Independent	Greg Wood	32	0.1	New
Independent	Eamonn Fitzpatrick	31	0.1	New
Make Politicians History	Ronnie Carroll	29	0.1	New
Independent	Thomas Darwood	25	0.1	New
Independent	Christopher Foren	23	0.1	New
Independent	Herbert Crossman	11	0.0	New
Independent	Tony Farnon	8	0.0	New
Independent	Norman Scarth	8	0.0	New
Majority		15,355	64.2	+53.5
Turnout		23,911	34.5	−35.6
Conservative hold		Swing		

=== Elections in the 2010s ===
General election 2010: Haltemprice and Howden
Party	Candidate	Votes	%	±%
Conservative	David Davis	24,486	50.2	+3.2
Liberal Democrats	Jon Neal	12,884	26.4	−10.0
Labour	Danny Marten	7,630	15.7	+2.2
BNP	James Cornell	1,583	3.2	+1.6
English Democrat	Joanne Robinson	1,485	3.0	New
Green	Shan Oakes	669	1.4	New
Majority		11,602	23.8	+13.1
Turnout		48,737	69.2	−0.9
Conservative hold		Swing		

General election 2015: Haltemprice and Howden
Party	Candidate	Votes	%	±%
Conservative	David Davis	26,414	54.2	+4.0
Labour	Edward Hart	10,219	21.0	+5.3
UKIP	John Kitchener	6,781	13.9	New
Liberal Democrats	Carl Minns	3,055	6.3	−20.1
Green	Tim Greene	1,809	3.7	+2.3
Yorkshire First	Diana Wallis	479	1.0	New
Majority		16,195	33.2	+9.4
Turnout		48,757	68.5	−0.7
Conservative hold		Swing	−0.7	

General election 2017: Haltemprice and Howden
Party	Candidate	Votes	%	±%
Conservative	David Davis	31,355	61.0	+6.8
Labour	Hollie Devanney	15,950	31.0	+10.0
Liberal Democrats	David Nolan	2,482	4.8	−1.5
Yorkshire	Diana Wallis	942	1.8	+0.8
Green	Angela Needham	711	1.4	−2.3
Majority		15,405	30.0	−3.2
Turnout		51,440	72.4	+3.9
Conservative hold		Swing	−1.6	

General election 2019: Haltemprice and Howden
Party	Candidate	Votes	%	±%
Conservative	David Davis	31,045	62.4	+1.4
Labour	George Ayre	10,716	21.5	−9.5
Liberal Democrats	Linda Johnson	5,215	10.5	+5.7
Green	Angela Stone	1,764	3.5	+2.1
Yorkshire	Richard Honnoraty	1,039	2.1	+0.3
Majority		20,329	40.9	+11.9
Turnout		49,779	70.1	−2.3
Conservative hold		Swing	+5.5	

== See also ==
- List of parliamentary constituencies in Humberside
