= Felicity Bryan =

British literary agent (1945–2020)

Felicity Anne Bryan MBE (16 October 1945 – 21 June 2020) was a British literary agent, the founder of Felicity Bryan Associates based in Oxford. She co-founded The Washington Post's Laurence Stern Fellowship. It was announced in June 2020 that the Fellowship was being renamed in her honour as the Stern-Bryan Fellowship.

== Biography ==
=== Early years and education ===
Bryan, the second of three daughters of Paul, a Conservative MP, and Betty (Hoyle) Bryan, was born in Sowerby Bridge, Yorkshire. One of her sisters was Elizabeth Bryan, a paediatrician She took a degree in History of Art at the Courtauld Institute of Art, London University.

=== Journalism ===
From 1968 to 1970, she worked with Joe Rogaly on the Financial Times in Washington DC. She then returned to London to write for the American Survey of The Economist. From 1975 to 1979 she wrote the weekly Gardening Column for the London Evening Standard. She contributed articles to UK newspapers.

In 1980, with Godfrey Hodgson and Benjamin Bradlee, she founded the Laurence Stern fellowship in memory of her friend Larry Stern. Every year it sends a young British journalist to work on The Washington Post. Alumni include James Naughtie, Lionel Barber, Mary Ann Sieghart, Cathy Newman and Gary Younge.

=== Literary agency ===
In 1973, Bryan joined the London literary agency Curtis Brown, where she remained for 15 years. By 1988, she had moved with her family to Oxford, saw it as an ideal place for a literary agency and started Felicity Bryan Ltd. She represented major international authors, including Karen Armstrong, Iain Pears, Rosamunde Pilcher, Matt Ridley, Diarmaid MacCulloch, John Julius Norwich and Edmund de Waal.

By 2010, the agency had expanded and underwent a management buyout, with her colleagues Catherine Clarke and Caroline Wood becoming co-owners of the newly formed Felicity Bryan Associates Ltd.

On 9 June 2020, Bryan announced her intention to retire from Felicity Bryan Associates, citing ill health.

== Awards ==
In 2010, Bryan was awarded an Honorary Doctorate from Oxford Brookes University for her work in publishing.

She was appointed Member of the Order of the British Empire (MBE) in the 2020 New Year Honours for services to publishing.

== Other activities ==
Bryan was a trustee of Equilibrium - The Bipolar Foundation. Passionate about ballet and opera, she represented the dancer Carlos Acosta for his memoir and writings. She was a Patron of the Woodstock Literary Festival and a Sponsor of the Oxford Literary Festival.

== Personal life ==
She was married to the economist Alex Duncan of The Policy Practice and lived near Oxford. They had three children: Alice Mary Duncan (born June 1982, died November 2004), Maxim Paul Duncan (born October 1983) and Benjamin Patrick Duncan (born May 1987). She was, earlier, married to Alasdair Clayre. Her elder sister, Dr Elizabeth Bryan, founder of The Multiple Births Foundation, died in 2008. Her younger sister Bernadette Hingley, who was one of the first British women to be ordained as a priest in the Church of England, died in 1995.

Bryan died of cancer on 21 June 2020, aged 74.

== Publications ==
- The Town Gardener’s Companion (Andre Deutsch/ Penguin)
- A Garden for Children (Michael Joseph)
- Nursery Style - with Annie Sloan (Viking)
- "Once we had a Daughter" (The Guardian)
