= Mad Cow Girl =

Mad Cow Girl could refer to:

- Mad Cowgirl (2006 film)
- Mad Cow-Girl (UK election candidate)
