= Paul Bryan (politician) =

British politician (1913–2004)

Sir Paul Bryan DSO MC

Member of Parliament for Boothferry (Howden, 1955–1983)
- In office 26 May 1955 – 18 May 1987
- Preceded by: Constituency established
- Succeeded by: David Davis

Personal details
- Born: Paul Elmore Oliver Bryan; 3 August 1913 Karuizawa, Empire of Japan
- Died: 11 October 2004 (aged 91) Sawdon, North Yorkshire, England
- Party: Conservative
- Spouses: Betty Hoyle (m. 1939; died 1968) Cynthia Duncan (m. 1971)
- Children: Elizabeth; Felicity; Bernadette
- Education: St John's School, Leatherhead
- Alma mater: Gonville and Caius College, Cambridge
- Civilian awards: Knight Bachelor (1972)

Military service
- Allegiance: United Kingdom
- Branch/service: British Army
- Rank: Lieutenant colonel
- Unit: Royal West Kent Regiment
- Commands: 6th Battalion
- Battles/wars: Second World War; Operation Torch; Allied invasion of Sicily; Allied invasion of Italy; Battle of Monte Cassino
- Military awards: Military Cross; Distinguished Service Order

Sir Paul Elmore Oliver Bryan DSO MC (3 August 1913 – 11 October 2004) was a British Conservative politician.

== Early life ==
Bryan was born in Karuizawa, Japan, the seventh of nine children of The Rev Ingram Bryan. He lived in Japan until he was eight and then returned to England and was educated at St John's School, Leatherhead. He studied Modern Languages at Gonville and Caius College, Cambridge, where he took great interest in sport, playing cricket and rugby – he was scrum half in the college rugby team where he played alongside his friend Iain Macleod, the future Conservative Chancellor. After graduating he worked in Halifax, Yorkshire, where he met his first wife Betty Hoyle. They married in 1939.

== Military career ==
Paul Bryan had a distinguished wartime career. He served with the Royal West Kent Regiment during World War II. He entered as a private soldier and attained the rank of lieutenant-colonel gaining the Military Cross and the Distinguished Service Order (DSO). In 1942 he fought first in North Africa as part of the Torch Landings. He was given command of 6th Battalion for the invasion of Sicily and then Italy in September 1943. For his "outstanding" leadership shown in the capture of Centuripe, Bronte and Monte Rivoglia in Sicily, he was awarded a DSO. After leading his battalion at Monte Cassino, he finished the war as commandant of a training unit established at Barmouth, Wales. Here he brought his wartime colleagues Denis Forman and Fred Majdelaney as instructors.

== Political career ==
Following the war he worked in Sowerby Bridge where he started to take an interest in politics. He contested Sowerby in 1949, 1950 and 1951. In 1955 he became Member of Parliament for Howden in the East Riding of Yorkshire, and later for Boothferry from 1983 until he retired in 1987. In 1956, Edward Heath, then Chief Whip, invited him to become a whip. He was vice-chairman of the Conservative Party 1961–65, a whip 1956 and 1958–61, and Minister for Employment from 1970 to 1972. Bryan was one of the first Tory MPs after the Labour victories of 1974 to suggest openly that it was time for Edward Heath to resign. In the leadership contest of 1975, he served on William Whitelaw's campaign committee. He was captain of the Parliamentary Golf Society and vice-chairman of the Conservative backbench 1922 Committee from 1977 to 1987.

Through his wartime friend Denis Forman he became involved in Granada Television where Sidney Bernstein invited him to join the board. He assembled the consortium which gained the licence for Piccadilly Radio in Manchester. He was chairman of Croydon Cable Television from 1985.

Having been brought up in The Far East he took a great interest in Japan and China. He was chairman of the All-Party Hong Kong Parliamentary Group from 1974 to 1987. He made many friends among political leaders and businessmen both in the colony and in mainland China. He took Chris Patten on his first visit to Hong Kong and later took great interest in the negotiations for the transfer of the colony to China. He took a practical approach to the negotiations. He had immense sympathy for the people of Hong Kong but believed that a handover to China was unavoidable; at the same time, he remained optimistic about the prospects for the colony under Chinese rule.

== Personal life ==
He had three daughters: Dr Elizabeth Bryan, a paediatrian; Felicity Bryan, a literary agent and writer; and Bernadette Hingley who was one of the first women priests in the Church of England.

In 1971 he married Cynthia Duncan, daughter of Sir Patrick Ashley Cooper and the widow of Patrick Duncan and gained four stepchildren: Patrick, Alex, Ann and Emma Duncan.

He had a passion for golf which he learned from his first father-in-law James Hoyle. He played regularly at Ganton Golf Course until his last years. He was President of Ganton Golf Club. While he never considered himself a good golfer, he gained fame in 1962 by hitting two holes-in-one in one round. After his death, members of the club placed a bench, inscribed with his name, on the course from which you can see both the holes. He became a Knight Bachelor in 1972.

Parliament of the United Kingdom
| New constituency | Member of Parliament for Howden; 1955–1983 | Constituency abolished |
| New constituency | Member of Parliament for Boothferry; 1983–1987 | Succeeded by David Davis |
