= Alasdair Clayre =

Author, broadcaster, singer-songwriter, and academic

Alasdair George Stuart Clayre (9 October 1935 – 10 January 1984) was a British author, broadcaster, singer-songwriter, and academic.

== Early life and career ==
Clayre was born in Southampton, Hampshire on 9 October 1935. He won a scholarship to Winchester College, where he became head boy, and a further scholarship to Christ Church, Oxford where, as an undergraduate, his intellect was compared to that of Isaiah Berlin. He graduated with a congratulatory first class degree - the highest class of degree awarded at Oxford (see British undergraduate degree classification) - and won a Prize Fellowship to All Souls College - one of the highest academic honours in the United Kingdom.

Clayre recorded two albums of songs including many of his own compositions: Alasdair Clayre (Elektra Records) and Adam and the Beasts (Folkways Records). He also appears on the Elektra folk song compilation A Cold Wind Blows. His English translation of "La Colombe" (The Dove") by Jacques Brel has been recorded by Judy Collins and Joan Baez. Another of his compositions, Train Song, has been recorded by Vashti Bunyan (who also co-wrote the song), while Adam and the Beasts has been recorded by Barry Dransfield and Shusha Guppy.

== Personal life ==
Clayre married Felicity Bryan in 1974. They divorced in 1980.

== Death ==
Clayre took his own life in 1984 by jumping in front of a train in North London.

== Selected publications ==
- The Heart of the Dragon (London: Collins, 1984), based on a TV series he produced, wrote, directed and presented about China at a time when the country was just opening up to the West
- Nature and Industrialisation: an Anthology (Oxford: Oxford University Press in association with the Open University, 1977)
- The Political Economy of Co-operation and Participation: a Third Sector (Oxford: Oxford University Press, 1980)
- Work and Play: Ideas and Experience of Work and Leisure (London: Weidenfeld & Nicolson, 1974)
- The Impact of Broadcasting; or, Mrs Buckle's Wall is Singing (Salisbury: Compton Russell, 1973), which includes a foreword by Asa Briggs
- 100 Folk Songs and New Songs, a songbook which he compiled; some of the new songs are his own compositions
- A Fire by the Sea (London: Calypso Press, 1965; 2nd edn Salisbury: Compton Russell, 1973), a book of poems
- The Window (n.p.: Cape, 1961)
- Dialogue (Newport: n.p., 1959), co-edited with P. Jay
