= Norman Scarth =

British World War II veteran and political candidate (1925–2024)

Norman Scarth (October 1925 – 2024) was a British World War II veteran, political candidate, farmer and blogger. He unsuccessfully stood for Parliament three times, and had been at the centre of controversy in several legal cases.

== Early life and military service ==
Scarth was born in Leeds, West Yorkshire, England in October 1925. He served on HMS Matchless in the Arctic convoys of World War II, receiving a medal from the Russian government in 1995.

== Farming ==
Scarth was a stud farmer. His horse Gracious Melody won the 1979/80 Henry Tudor Challenge Cup.

== Elections ==
Scarth was a candidate three times in UK parliamentary elections – in 1997 in Chesterfield (receiving 202 votes, 0.4%); in 2007 in Sedgefield (receiving 34 votes, 0.1%); and in 2008 in Haltemprice and Howden (receiving 8 votes, 0.0%). In Sedgefield, police were called to move him when he campaigned outside a supermarket. In Haltemprice and Howden he came joint last with 8 votes. He stood on an anti-crime platform and argued that "modern surveillance methods were as bad as the Nazis'".

Scarth also stood for his own Anti-Crime Party in local elections in Bradford, first standing in Bingley in 2007. He was arrested for shouting through a loudhailer outside a polling station in 2008, and challenged the election result, in which he received 66 votes, with the election commissioner. A judge ruled that his case was "wholly misconceived".

== Legal matters ==
In 1990, Scarth argued that he was not wearing a seat belt because he was about to commit suicide, but his defence was not accepted by the court.

Scarth was the plaintiff in the case Scarth v. United Kingdom at the European Court of Human Rights (ECHR 33745/96) that resolved that private hearings in small claims arbitration at county courts breached Article 6 of the European Convention on Human Rights. Civil Procedure Rules introduced in 1999 avoided further breaches.

Scarth spent four years in jail and two years in a psychiatric hospital, which he says was part of a conspiracy against him.

In July 2011, Scarth, who represented himself, was sentenced to six months imprisonment for contempt of court for recording a court hearing and for "contempt for all lawyers and judges". In September an appeals court reduced the sentence to 12 weeks less one day and he was immediately released. Lord Justice Pitchford stated: "Having had the benefit of information about the background, which was not available to the judge and could not have been since Mr Scarth refused to take part, we are quite satisfied that the public interest is not served by the continued imprisonment of this 85-year-old man without in any way reflecting upon the correctness of the decision made by the judge at the time", adding, "He is an unusual individual in that the nature of his personality disorder means that he is not one of those who is likely to see the error of his ways and, to use technical language, purge his contempt."

== Death ==
On 4 December 2024, Veterans For Peace Ireland announced that Scarth had died earlier that year in Ballinasloe, County Galway, Ireland. He was 98.
