= Howden (constituency) =

Parliamentary constituency in the United Kingdom, 1955–1983

Coordinates: 53.747°N 0.865°W

- Former county constituency for the House of Commons
- County: Yorkshire

1955–1983
- Seats: One
- Created from: Beverley and Bridlington
- Replaced by: Boothferry, Selby, Bridlington and Ryedale

Howden was a constituency in Yorkshire which returned one Member of Parliament (MP) to the House of Commons of the Parliament of the United Kingdom. It was created for the 1955 general election, made up largely of the constituency of Beverley (losing some territory in the south to Haltemprice, and taking some in the east from Bridlington).

The Howden constituency was abolished for the 1983 general election.

== Boundaries ==
The Urban Districts of Driffield and Norton, and the Rural Districts of Derwent, Driffield, Howden, Norton, and Pocklington.

== Members of Parliament ==
Election	Member	Party
1955	Paul Bryan	Conservative
1983	constituency abolished: see Boothferry	

== Election results ==
=== Elections in the 1970s ===
General election 1979: Howden
Party	Candidate	Votes	%	±%
Conservative	Paul Bryan	26,550	56.0	+9.0
Liberal	Elizabeth Shields	12,006	25.3	−10.2
Labour	A. B. Davenport	8,827	18.6	+1.1
Majority		14,544	30.7	+19.2
Turnout		47,383	74.4	+2.0
Conservative hold		Swing		

General election October 1974: Howden
Party	Candidate	Votes	%	±%
Conservative	Paul Bryan	19,583	47.0	−1.8
Liberal	Stuart Haywood	14,803	35.5	+0.5
Labour	Harry Lewis	7,271	17.5	+1.3
Majority		4,780	11.5	−2.3
Turnout		41,657	72.4	−6.2
Conservative hold		Swing		

General election February 1974: Howden
Party	Candidate	Votes	%	±%
Conservative	Paul Bryan	21,892	48.8	−8.2
Liberal	Stuart Haywood	15,681	35.0	+17.1
Labour	James Kirkwood	7,259	16.2	−8.5
Majority		6,211	13.8	−18.5
Turnout		44,832	78.6	+7.8
Conservative hold		Swing		

General election 1970: Howden
Party	Candidate	Votes	%	±%
Conservative	Paul Bryan	22,102	57.0	+6.4
Labour	John W. R. Graham	9,567	24.7	−2.2
Liberal	James Francis Crossley	6,951	17.9	−4.6
Independent	Tonderai Makoni	154	0.4	New
Majority		12,535	32.3	+8.6
Turnout		38,774	70.8	−1.0
Conservative hold		Swing		

=== Elections in the 1960s ===
General election 1966: Howden
Party	Candidate	Votes	%	±%
Conservative	Paul Bryan	17,701	50.6	−2.6
Labour	G. McNamara	9,421	26.9	+5.0
Liberal	John J. MacCullum	7,885	22.5	−2.4
Majority		8,280	23.7	−4.6
Turnout		35,007	71.8	−4.1
Conservative hold		Swing		

General election 1964: Howden
Party	Candidate	Votes	%	±%
Conservative	Paul Bryan	19,367	53.2	−4.5
Liberal	John O K Crawford	9,067	24.9	+4.3
Labour	Allan Day	7,974	21.9	+0.1
Majority		10,300	28.3	−6.6
Turnout		36,408	75.9	+0.1
Conservative hold		Swing		

=== Elections in the 1950s ===
General election 1959: Howden
Party	Candidate	Votes	%	±%
Conservative	Paul Bryan	20,681	57.7	−0.5
Labour	John Rhodes	7,809	21.8	−4.1
Liberal	Ruslyn Hargreaves	7,384	20.6	+4.7
Majority		12,872	35.9	+2.6
Turnout		35,874	75.8	+2.1
Conservative hold		Swing		

General election 1955: Howden
Party	Candidate	Votes	%	±%
Conservative	Paul Bryan	20,487	58.2	
Labour	Robert W. Bowes	9,088	25.9	
Liberal	William Derek Ramsdale	5,575	15.9	
Majority		11,399	32.3	
Turnout		35,150	73.7	
Conservative hold		Swing		
