= David Craig (author) =

British author

David Craig (real name Neil Glass) is a British author. He has been a management consultant and in his 2005 book Rip-Off!: the scandalous inside story of the management consulting money machine he criticised the greed and sharp practice of consultants. His next book Plundering the Public Sector: how New Labour are letting consultants run off with £70 billion of our money was co-authored by Richard Brooks and addressed consultancy in the public sector. In April 2008 he published Squandered: how Gordon Brown is wasting over one trillion pounds of our money.

He adopted a pseudonym, and created the publishing house "The Original Book Company", to publish Rip-off! after it was turned down by conventional publishers "for fear, he says, that it might upset the wrong people". After it sold 10,000 copies his next two books were published by commercial publisher Constable, but he kept the pseudonym to benefit from the first book's success.

In June 2008 Craig announced that he would stand as a candidate in the 2008 Haltemprice and Howden by-election, but came tenth out of 26 candidates, with 0.6% of the vote; the Conservative party's David Davis won with 71.6%.

== Bibliography ==
- Craig, David (2005). Rip-off!: The Scandalous Inside Story of the Management Consulting Money Machine. Original Book Co. ISBN 978-1-872188-06-5. Archived from the original on 29 May 2008. (available online, first chapter free of charge)
- Craig, David; Richard Brooks (2006). Plundering the Public Sector: : how New Labour are letting consultants run off with £70 billion of our money. Constable. ISBN 978-1-84529-374-1.
- Craig, David (2008). Squandered: how Gordon Brown is wasting over one trillion pounds of our money. Constable. ISBN 978-1-84529-832-6.
