= Boothferry (constituency) =

UK Parliament constituency (1983–1997)

Coordinates: 53.736°N 0.883°W

- Former county constituency for the House of Commons
- Boothferry in Humberside, showing boundaries used from 1983–1997
- County: 1983–1996 Humberside; 1996–1997 East Riding of Yorkshire, North Lincolnshire
- Major settlements: Goole, Epworth and Howden

1983–1997
- Seats: One
- Created from: Goole, Howden, Gainsborough, Haltemprice
- Replaced by: Brigg and Goole, East Yorkshire, Haltemprice and Howden, Beverley and Holderness

Boothferry was a constituency in Humberside which returned one Member of Parliament (MP) to the House of Commons of the Parliament of the United Kingdom. It was created for the 1983 general election, and abolished for the 1997 general election.

== History ==
This was a safe Conservative seat for the fourteen years of its existence.

== Boundaries ==
The Borough of Boothferry, the Borough of East Yorkshire wards of Battleburn, Garrowby, Market Weighton, Pocklington, Stamford Bridge, Vale, Wilberfoss, Wold, and Woodland, and the East Yorkshire Borough of Beverley wards of Cherry Holme, Skidby and Rowley, South Cave, and Walkington.

Named after the Humberside district of Boothferry, this constituency included areas which before local government reorganisation in 1974 had been in the West Riding of Yorkshire (Goole), the East Riding of Yorkshire (Howden) and Lincolnshire, Parts of Lindsey (Epworth and the Isle of Axholme). Apart from Goole itself, the constituency was largely rural.

As Humberside was awarded an extra seat in the boundary review implemented in 1997, the constituency was split into four, Brigg and Goole, East Yorkshire, Haltemprice and Howden and Beverley and Holderness being the destinations of the constituents in descending order.

== Members of Parliament ==
Election	Member	Party
1983	Paul Bryan	Conservative
1987	David Davis	Conservative
1997	constituency abolished: see Brigg and Goole, East Yorkshire, Haltemprice and Howden & Beverley and Holderness	

== Elections ==
=== Elections in the 1980s ===
General election 1983: Boothferry
Party	Candidate	Votes	%	±%
Conservative	Paul Bryan	30,536	57.7	
Liberal	Andrew Ellis	13,116	24.8	
Labour	Terry Geraghty	9,271	17.5	
Majority		17,420	32.9	
Turnout		52,923	73.1	
Conservative win (new seat)				

General election 1987: Boothferry
Party	Candidate	Votes	%	±%
Conservative	David Davis	31,716	55.7	−2.0
Liberal	Joan Davies	12,746	22.4	−2.4
Labour	Roy Donson	12,498	21.9	+4.4
Majority		18,970	33.3	+0.4
Turnout		56,960	75.8	+2.7
Conservative hold		Swing		

=== Elections in the 1990s ===
General election 1992: Boothferry
Party	Candidate	Votes	%	±%
Conservative	David Davis	35,266	54.8	−0.9
Labour	Louise M. Coubrough	17,731	27.5	+5.6
Liberal Democrats	John M. Goss	11,388	17.7	−4.7
Majority		17,535	27.3	−6.0
Turnout		64,385	79.9	+4.1
Conservative hold		Swing	−3.3	

== See also ==
- List of parliamentary constituencies in Humberside
