= David Davis 2008 by-election campaign =

British political campaign

The logo of the campaign

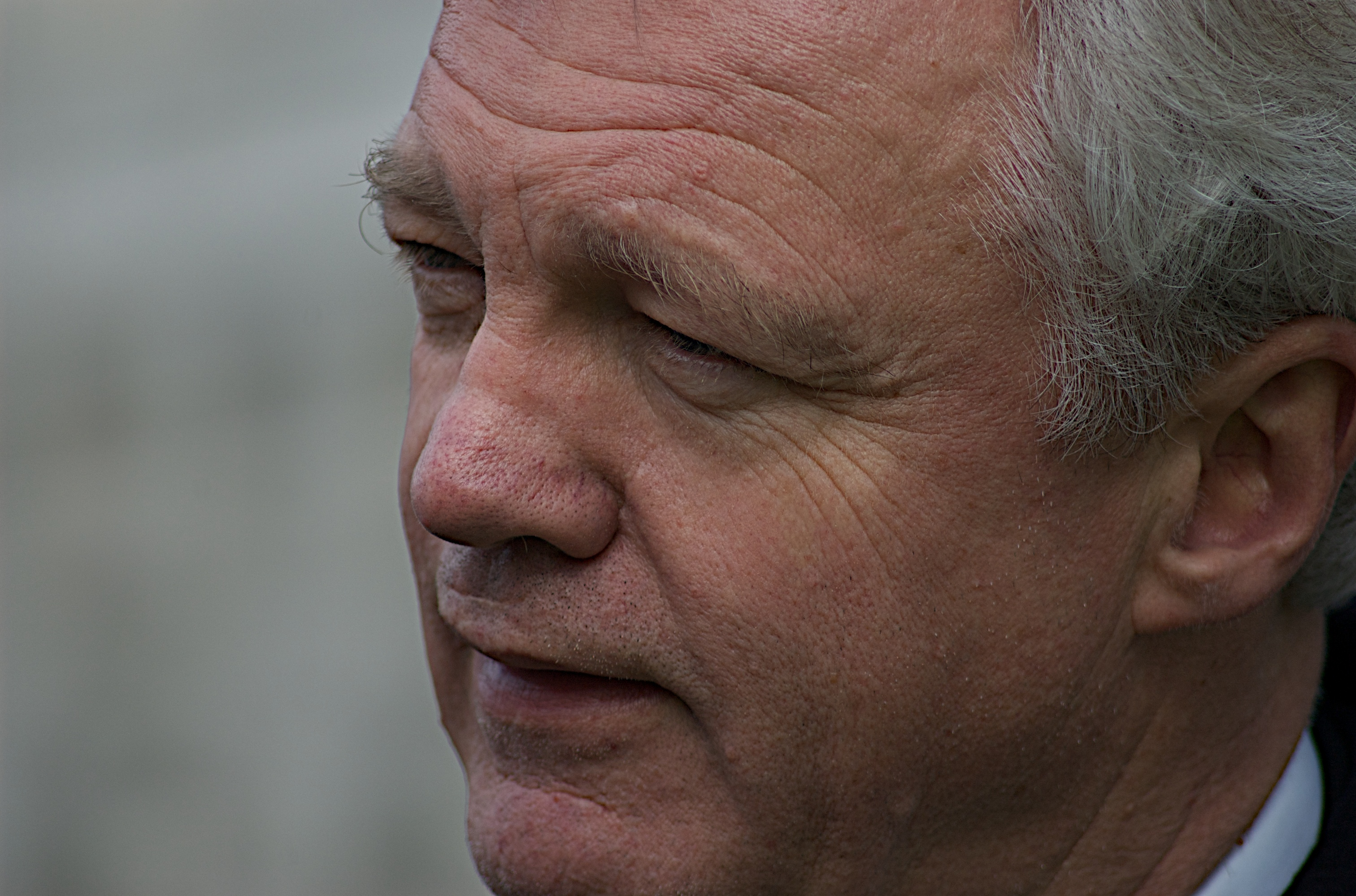
David Davis MP

The David Davis by-election campaign of 2008 was a political campaign against the erosion of civil liberties in the United Kingdom, led by the former Conservative Member of Parliament (MP), David Davis, labelled by Davis as the David Davis For Freedom campaign.

The campaign was initiated in June 2008, following Davis's surprise resignation as an MP and hence from his position as the Shadow Home Secretary, and was the platform he used in standing for re-election to his seat in the resultant Haltemprice and Howden by-election. Davis subsequently won his seat back with 72% of the vote. No established candidates stood against Davis, and no candidate opposing Davis polled more than 8% of the turnout. After winning the by-election, Davis returned to Parliament as a backbencher, vowing to continue the campaign.

Davis's resignation followed a parliamentary vote on the Counter-Terrorism Bill, which would extend the maximum detention of terror suspects without charge from 28 to 42 days. Announcing his resignation, he stated his intention was to spark a wider public debate on the erosion of civil liberties by the incumbent Labour government, and specifically the policies of the Prime Minister, Gordon Brown.

Davis's motives produced both praise and criticism, and split public opinion. The campaign was also questioned because Davis's opinions prior to his resignation were in line with those of his party, where, as Shadow Home Secretary, he was in a good position to effect change should the Conservatives win the next general election, predicted for 2010. Criticism was also levelled at the use of the triggering of a by-election to stand on a single issue of principle, while not un-precedented. Criticism also cited the perceived waste of public money in holding a by-election, estimated to cost £80,000.

== Background ==
Late on the night of 11 June 2008, a parliamentary vote was held on whether to extend the limit on the period of detention of terror suspects without charge in England and Wales, from 28 to 42 days. The issue had been a contentious one in the media in the preceding weeks, with the Prime Minister urging for the extension, following past dropped proposals of 90 days, as being a vital tool in the protection of the British public, in the war on terrorism.

The vote was narrowly passed in the House of Commons by 9 votes, after the Conservatives and Liberal Democrats, together with 36 defecting Labour MPs, voted against the government. The vote was passed with the support of the government by the Democratic Unionist Party (DUP), who had nine elected MPs.

Speaking after his resignation, Davis stated that he intended to induce a wider public debate, and stop "the insidious and relentless erosion of civil liberties in Britain", in which the detention vote was a "watershed" in the debate, which also encompassed recent legislation about the increased use of CCTV, the Identity Cards Act 2006, and the expansion of the DNA database, which represented "the slow strangulation of fundamental freedoms by this government".

== Timeline ==
Davis's resignation announcement came on 12 June 2008, a day after the passing of the initial vote on detention. Davis gave a post-resignation press conference outside parliament, having been refused the opportunity to do so in the House of Commons by the Speaker. His resignation speech came on the back of a similar newspaper column written by previous Conservative Prime Minister John Major a week earlier. Davis would be the official Conservative candidate in the by-election.

Critics initially described Davis's decision as an emotional and knee-jerk reaction; however, Davis later stated that the idea to resign if the vote was passed came as early as the previous weekend, and he had discussed standing down with his local party earlier in the week.

On suggestions that the Labour Party might not field a candidate because of the nature of the campaign, the safeness of the seat, and the previous bad result for Labour in the 2008 Crewe and Nantwich by-election, Davis stated that "we will have the campaign anyway, and find people to argue on both sides of the debate".

On 13 June, the former editor of The Sun newspaper, Kelvin MacKenzie, announced that he was 90% certain to contest the election, should Labour not stand. He would stand on a pro-42-day detention platform, stating: "I have been associated with The Sun for 30 years. The Sun is very, very hostile to David Davis because of his 28 day stance and The Sun has always been very up for 42 days and perhaps even 420 days". In the event, MacKenzie did not run.

On 16 June, an official campaign website, www.daviddavisforfreedom.com, and a YouTube channel daviddavisforfreedom were launched.

Davis formally stood down as an MP on 18 June 2008, by accepting the position of Steward and Bailiff of the Three Hundreds of Chiltern, which he immediately renounced in order to be able to stand for the by-election; this is the traditional method of resigning from Parliament, since MPs are not permitted to hold most positions in the gift of the Crown without approval from their constituencies. Immediately after the announcement, Labour announced they would not field a candidate.

On 19 June, comments by then-Culture Secretary (and future Prime Minister) Andy Burnham contrasting Davis's past political record on libertarian issues with the views of Liberty director Shami Chakrabarti, whom Davis had asked for advice prior to his resignation, brought a threat of litigation from Chakrabarti to Burnham pending an apology.

On 20 June, in an appearance on the panel of Question Time, Davis conceded that he was unlikely to be "offered his job (in the shadow cabinet) back" and the likely setback to his political career was a "cost he would have to bear" as a result of his decision to resign.

On 11 July, Davis was re-elected to his seat with 72% of the vote. Davis received 17,113 votes, with the closest challenge coming from the Green Party and English Democrats with 1,758 and 1,714 votes respectively. All other candidates lost their deposits due to polling less than 5% of the vote.

In his acceptance speech after the by-election, Davis stated that "today is not the end of this campaign", pledging to continue campaigning against 42-day detention, ID cards and governmental invasion of privacy. Davis returned to Parliament as a backbencher, with no immediate likelihood of a return to the Shadow Cabinet.

== Reaction ==
While the Conservative party voted against the 42 day extension in the initial poll, in the days following his resignation, Davis's move was characterised by Conservative party leader David Cameron as a "very courageous and brave" decision, but a "personal decision, and not one of the Shadow Cabinet or Conservative Party", although the Daily Telegraph newspaper claimed that Cameron believed it was unnecessary for Davis to resign, and had clearly told Davis of his view. Liberty director Shami Chakrabarti described the move as "very brave".

Davis's Campaign Manager in the 2005 Conservative leadership contest, Andrew Mitchell (who in 2010 became the Secretary of State for International Development), although remaining a strong supporter of Davis, was reported by the media to have met him on the House of Commons terrace and was seen to have "looked horrified" when Davis told him of his decision, and to have vigorously argued with him about it. His friends apparently said later that he was "incandescent" at not having been consulted beforehand. Davis allegedly replied: "It's too late – I've already done it", to which Mitchell allegedly responded: "You're nuts!".

Opinion outside Westminster was also sharply divided over Davis's actions. Many media commentators poured scorn on Davis for precipitating an unnecessary by-election, characterising his actions as "quixotic", "egotistical" or even "mad". Equally, he was described as a "new voice of the people", and as setting a "powerful example". The varying opinions were characterised as "a torrent of conflicting views".

A national poll for The Independent reported that 48% thought Mr Davis was wrong to resign over 42 days detention against 39% who believed he was right.

== Funding ==
Immediately following his resignation, Conservative party leader David Cameron stated that he would campaign for Davis, but he would receive no funding from Conservative Party HQ. On the day after the by-election, Davis stated on BBC Radio 2's Jeremy Vine Show that this lack of party funding had produced an unexpected demonstration of grassroots support for the campaign, with the subsequent donation of £40,000 toward the campaign in small amounts from many sources around the country.

Culture Secretary Andy Burnham called on Davis to fund the cost of the by-election to the taxpayer, estimated at £80,000, from his own pocket.

== See also ==
- Civil liberties in the United Kingdom
- Detention (confinement)
