= Elizabeth M. Bryan =

British paediatrician who specialised in multiple births and twins

- Born: 13 May 1942; Sowerby Bridge, West Yorkshire
- Died: 21 February 2008 (aged 65)
- Medical career
- Field: Paediatrics
- Institutions: Royal Postgraduate Medical School, Queen Charlotte's and Chelsea Hospital, International Society for Twin Studies
- Sub-specialties: Multiple births

Elizabeth Mary Bryan (13 May 1942 – 21 February 2008) was a British paediatrician who specialised in multiple births and twins.

== Early life ==
Elizabeth Bryan was born in Sowerby Bridge, West Yorkshire. She was the eldest of three daughters born to Paul Bryan, a Conservative MP, and Betty Hoyle, a physiotherapist. Elizabeth claimed that she decided to become a doctor after watching a documentary about African children in a hospital at the age of six. She was educated at Duncombe Park in Helmsley, and then at Benenden School in Kent. She began her medical training at St Thomas's Hospital Medical School in London, but she left her studies for a year to nurse her mother, who had developed bipolar disorder; she resumed her training at Scarborough General Hospital and qualified with an MBBS in 1966.

== Career ==
Bryan trained as a paediatrician at York Hospital and London's Hammersmith Hospital. She returned to York in 1975 to work as a senior clinical medical officer. She first became interested in twins in 1973, after assisting in the delivery of a set of twins: as a result of twin-twin transfusion syndrome, one was large and red while the other was small and pale. Inspired by this encounter, she gained an MD in 1977 with her thesis on "Serum Immunoglobulins in Twin Pregnancy with Particular Reference to the Fetofetal Transfusion Syndrome". In 1978, she co-founded the Twins and Multiple Births Association and published guidelines for healthcare workers on managing multiple births. She moved back to London in 1979, becoming a consultant paediatrician at Queen Charlotte's and Chelsea Hospital. She was a senior research fellow and later a senior lecturer at the Royal Postgraduate Medical School, where she taught until 1995. From 1987, she established specialised clinics for twins in London, York and Birmingham. In response to the rise in multiple births caused by the increasing popularity of in vitro fertilisation (IVF), she founded the Multiple Births Foundation, a charity that provides support to twins' families, in 1988. She also campaigned for IVF providers to reduce the number of embryos they implanted, to decrease the incidence of multiple births.

Throughout her career, Bryan encountered over 100 sets of twins, and when she married in 1978, 25 pairs of twins attended her wedding. She and her husband, Ronald Higgins, an ecologist and diplomat, wrote a book titled Infertility: New Choices, New Dilemmas (1995) about their failed experience with IVF and other attempts to become pregnant. With her 1995 book, Twins, Triplets and More, she was one of the first to write about the unique psychology of being a twin or triplet. She was also among the first people to study the grief felt by a twin when the other dies and established a clinic for bereaved twins.

Bryan was president of the Twins and Multiple Births Association from 1978 until 1984 and was a trustee until 1991. She directed the Multiple Births Foundation from its founding in 1988 until 1998. She was elected president of the International Society for Twin Studies in 1998 and held the position until 2001. She was elected as a Fellow of the Royal College of Physicians in 1989 and was a reader in paediatrics at the Imperial College School of Medicine from 1995 until her retirement in 2005.

== Health problems and death ==
Bryan discovered in 1975 that she carried the BRCA1 gene mutation, which predisposes carriers to ovarian and breast cancer. One of her sisters died from ovarian cancer, while the other developed breast cancer; as a precaution, Bryan had her ovaries removed and underwent a double mastectomy in 1992. She was eventually diagnosed with pancreatic cancer in 2005 and underwent surgery and chemotherapy. In 2007, she published a book, Singing the Life: The Story of a Family in the Shadow of Cancer, about her family's experience with cancer. She died a year later, on 21 February 2008.
