= David Davis (British politician) =

English politician (born 1948)

The Right Honourable Sir David Davis KCB MP
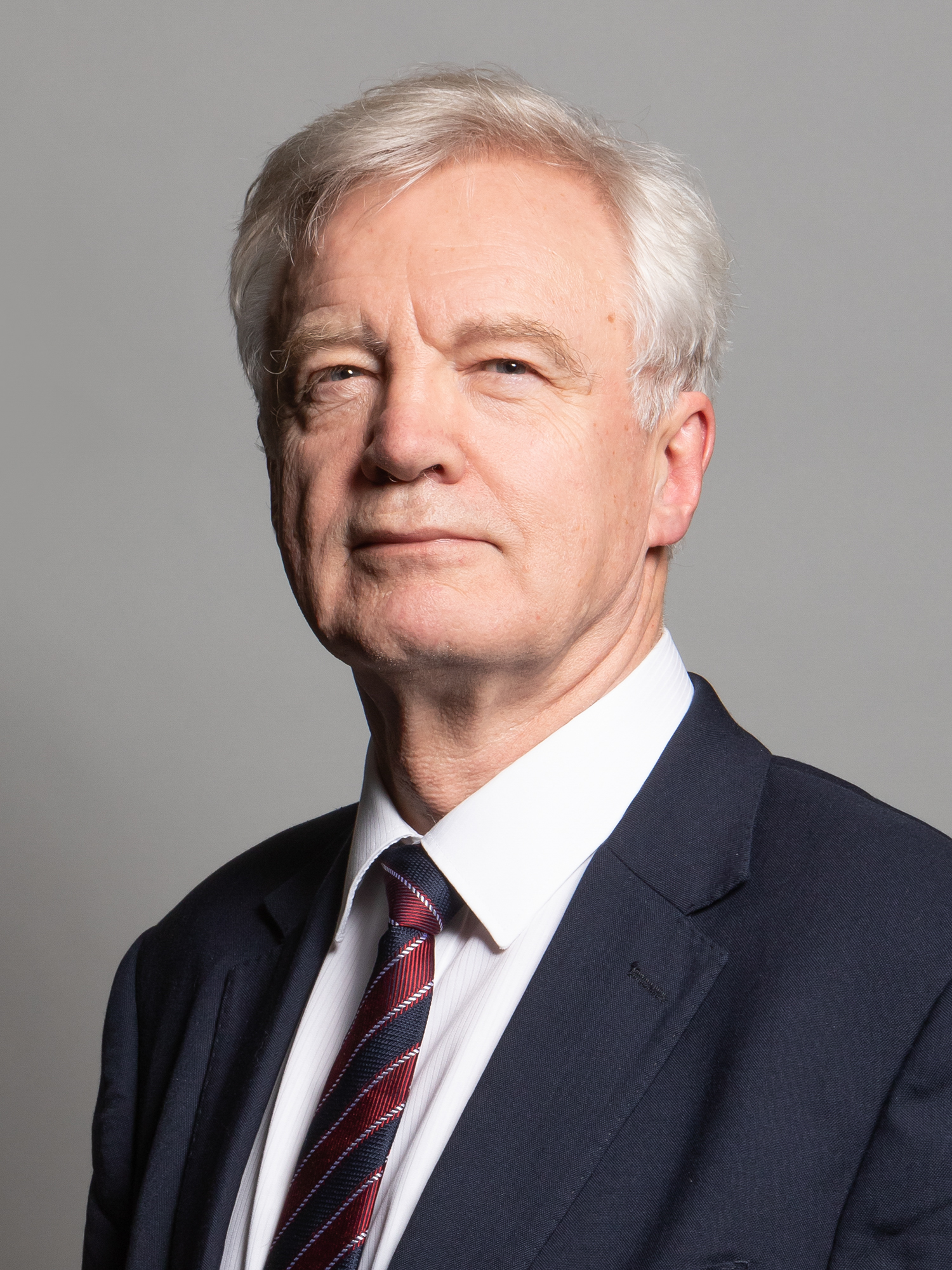
- Official portrait, 2020

Secretary of State for Exiting the European Union
- In office 13 July 2016 – 8 July 2018
- Prime Minister: Theresa May
- Preceded by: Office established
- Succeeded by: Dominic Raab

Chief Negotiator for Exiting the European Union
- In office 13 July 2016 – 18 September 2017
- Prime Minister: Theresa May
- Preceded by: Office established
- Succeeded by: Olly Robbins

Chairman of the Conservative Party
- In office 18 September 2001 – 23 July 2002
- Leader: Iain Duncan Smith
- Preceded by: Michael Ancram
- Succeeded by: Theresa May

Chairman of the Public Accounts Committee
- In office 18 June 1997 – 7 June 2001
- Preceded by: Robert Sheldon
- Succeeded by: Edward Leigh

Minister of State for Europe
- In office 20 July 1994 – 2 May 1997
- Prime Minister: John Major
- Preceded by: David Heathcoat-Amory
- Succeeded by: Doug Henderson

Member of Parliament
- Incumbent
- Assumed office 11 June 1987 (Note: Resigned on 12 June 2008, but was re-elected in the following by-election and returned to Parliament on 10 July.)
- Preceded by: Paul Bryan
- Constituency: Boothferry (1987–1997); Haltemprice and Howden (1997–2024); Goole and Pocklington (2024–present)
- Majority: 3,572 (7.0%)

Shadow cabinet portfolios
- 2002–2003: Office of the Deputy Prime Minister
- 2003–2008: Home Department

Personal details
- Born: David Michael Brown; 23 December 1948 (age 77) York, England
- Party: Conservative
- Spouse: Doreen Cook (m. 1973)
- Children: 3
- Education: University of Warwick (BSc); London Business School (MBA)
- Website: Official Website

Military service
- Allegiance: United Kingdom
- Branch/service: Territorial Army
- Unit: 21 SAS (Artists)

Sir David Michael Davis (born 23 December 1948) is a British Conservative Party politician who has served as the Member of Parliament (MP) for Goole and Pocklington, previously Haltemprice and Howden and Boothferry, since 1987. He served as Shadow Home Secretary from 2003 to 2008 and Secretary of State for Exiting the European Union from 2016 to 2018. Davis was sworn of the Privy Council in the 1997 New Year Honours, while serving as Minister of State for Europe, a role he held from 1994 to 1997.

Brought up on the Aboyne Estate, a council estate in Tooting, south-west London, he attended Bec School. Later he earned an MBA from London Business School and worked for Tate & Lyle. He was a close personal friend of former leader of the Scottish National Party and First Minister of Scotland Alex Salmond. Having entered Parliament in 1987, he was appointed Europe Minister by Prime Minister John Major in July 1994. He held that position until the 1997 general election. He was subsequently Chairman of the Conservative Party and Shadow Secretary of State for the Office of the Deputy Prime Minister under Iain Duncan Smith.

Between 2003 and 2008 he was the Shadow Home Secretary in the Shadow Cabinets of both Michael Howard and David Cameron. Davis had previously been a candidate in the 2001 and 2005 Conservative Party leadership elections, coming fourth and second respectively. On 12 June 2008 Davis unexpectedly announced his intention to resign as an MP and was immediately replaced as Shadow Home Secretary; this was in order to force a by-election in his seat, for which he intended to seek reelection by mounting a specific campaign designed to provoke wider public debate about the erosion of civil liberties in the United Kingdom. Following his formal resignation as an MP, he became the Conservative candidate in the resulting by-election, which he won a month later.

In July 2016, following the Brexit referendum, Davis was appointed by the new prime minister, Theresa May, to the new Department for Exiting the European Union (DExEU) as Secretary of State, with responsibility for negotiating the UK's prospective exit from the EU. He was sidelined mid-way through the talks, with the Prime Minister's Europe Adviser Olly Robbins taking charge of negotiations. Davis resigned from his government position on 8 July 2018 over May's Brexit strategy and the Chequers plan. Following his resignation, the DExEU junior minister Steve Baker and the Foreign Secretary Boris Johnson also resigned.

Since 2018, Davis has remained active in the House of Commons as a backbencher, using parliamentary privilege to criticise various issues, including the Scottish Government's investigation into allegations of sexual misconduct by Alex Salmond, doubts about the conviction of Lucy Letby, and the scandal surrounding Peter Mandelson's relationship with Jeffrey Epstein. He was appointed a Knight Commander of the Order of the Bath (KCB) in the 2023 Political Honours for public and political service.

== Early life and career ==
David Davis was born on 23 December 1948 in York to a single mother, Betty Brown. He was initially raised by his grandparents. His maternal grandfather, Walter Harrison, was the son of a wealthy trawlerman, but was disinherited after joining the Communist Party; he led a "hunger march" to London shortly after the more famous Jarrow March, which did not allow Communists to participate. His father, whom he met once after his mother's death, was Welsh. After his mother married Ronald Davis the family moved to London, where they lived initially in a flat in Wandsworth, which Davis has described as "a terrible little slum". Later, after his half-sister was born, the family moved to a council estate in Tooting, his stepfather being a shop steward at Battersea Power Station.

Davis went to Bec School in Tooting, and when he left, his A-level results were not good enough to secure a university place. He subsequently worked as an insurance clerk and became a soldier in the Territorial Army's 21 SAS (Artists) to earn the money needed to retake his examinations. After doing so he won a place at the University of Warwick, where he graduated with a BSc Joint Hons in Molecular Science and Computer Science in 1971. While at Warwick he was one of the founding members of the student radio station, University Radio Warwick. While a student, Davis was active in the Federation of Conservative Students, becoming national chairman in 1973. He studied for an MBA at London Business School from 1971 to 1973. Davis worked for Tate & Lyle for 17 years, rising to become a senior executive, including restructuring its troubled Canadian subsidiary, Redpath Sugar. He wrote about his business experiences in the 1988 book How to Turn Round a Company.

== Parliamentary career ==
Davis was first elected to Parliament in the 1987 general election as the MP for Boothferry, when he was elected with 55.7% of the vote and a majority of 18,970. At the 1992 general election, Davis was re-elected as MP for Boothferry with a decreased vote share of 54.8% and a decreased majority of 17,535. Davis's constituency of Boothferry was abolished in 1997 and replaced with the new constituency of Haltemprice and Howden. At the 1997 general election, Davis was elected as MP for Haltemprice and Howden, winning with 44% of the vote and a majority of 7,514.

In 1999, Davis presented the Parliamentary Control of the Executive Bill to the House of Commons, in which he proposed to transfer ministerial exercise of the royal prerogative to the Commons in the following areas: the signing of treaties; the diplomatic recognition of foreign governments; European Union legislation; the appointment of ministers, peers and ambassadors; the establishment of Royal Commissions; the proclamation of Orders in Council unless subject to resolutions of the Commons; the exercise of the powers of the executive not made by statute; the declarations of states of emergency; the dissolution of parliament.

At the 2001 general election, Davis was re-elected as MP for Haltemprice and Howden with a decreased vote share of 43.2% and a decreased majority of 1,903. He rejected a shadow ministerial position under William Hague, opting instead to chair the Public Accounts Committee. Davis used his first interview as Shadow Home Secretary in November 2003 to state his personal support for a reintroduction of the death penalty for people convicted of multiple murder "where there is clear evidence and no doubt" surrounding the offender's guilt, citing the Yorkshire Ripper Peter Sutcliffe and Moors Murderer Ian Brady as examples of offenders who would fall into that category. This interview came almost 40 years after the abolition of the death penalty for murder.

At the 2005 general election, Davis was again re-elected, with an increased vote share of 47.5% and an increased majority of 5,116 votes. Davis believed that once the true cost and unreliability of the ID card scheme was explained to the general public they would turn against it. He was also credited by some commentators with "claiming the scalps" of two Labour ministers, David Blunkett and Beverley Hughes, after both were forced to resign.

=== 2005 leadership contest ===
At the time of the 2005 Conservative leadership contest, Davis was Shadow Secretary of State for the Home Department. His campaign manager in the contest was Conservative MP and Davis's deputy as Shadow Home Secretary, Andrew Mitchell (who in 2010 became Secretary of State for International Development in Prime Minister David Cameron's cabinet). Davis was initially the front runner in the contest, but after a poorly received speech at that year's Conservative Party Conference his campaign was seen to lose momentum.

Referring to a Conference speech by the party's former leader, campaign manager Andrew Mitchell said: "William Hague made a great speech which many people will judge to be better than all the other leadership candidates put together. What that tells you is that being absolutely brilliant at being able to make a speech at conference is not the be-all-and-end-all of leadership. There are other things as well." He was photographed at the conference alongside two women wearing T-shirts emblazoned with "It's DD for me" which was viewed by some women as being patronising to them.

In the first ballot of Conservative MPs on 18 October 2005, Davis came top with 62 votes. As this was less than the number of his declared supporters, it became clear that the Davis bid was losing momentum. The elimination of former Chancellor Kenneth Clarke left the bookmakers' favourite, David Cameron, without a rival in the centre of the party. In the second ballot, held two days later, Cameron polled 90 votes, Davis 57 votes and Liam Fox was eliminated with 51 votes, so Davis went through to the next stage with Cameron.

Despite a strong performance in a BBC Question Time head-to-head debate in the final stage of the leadership contest, Davis could not match his rival's general popularity. Conservative Party members voted to elect Cameron the new Conservative leader, Davis losing with 64,398 votes against Cameron's 134,446 votes. Cameron chose to re-appoint his rival as Shadow Home Secretary following his victory. As Shadow Home Secretary, Davis turned the Conservatives away from the Labour Party's plan to reintroduce identity cards, citing spiralling costs and libertarian issues.

=== Alleged role in leaking of government documents ===
Davis is alleged to have played a role in the leaking of sensitive government documents when he was Shadow Home Secretary in 2007. According to a police statement, under interview after arrest, civil servant Christopher Galley said Davis was his first contact and that he (Davis) introduced him to Damian Green, the Shadow Immigration spokesman. Galley initially approached Davis stating he had access to government immigration details which he was willing to leak to help the Conservative Party. Under questioning by police Galley said that Green told him "do not mention Davis". In April 2009, following a disciplinary hearing, Galley was dismissed from his job as a junior Home Office official for leaking information to Green.

=== Civil liberties ===
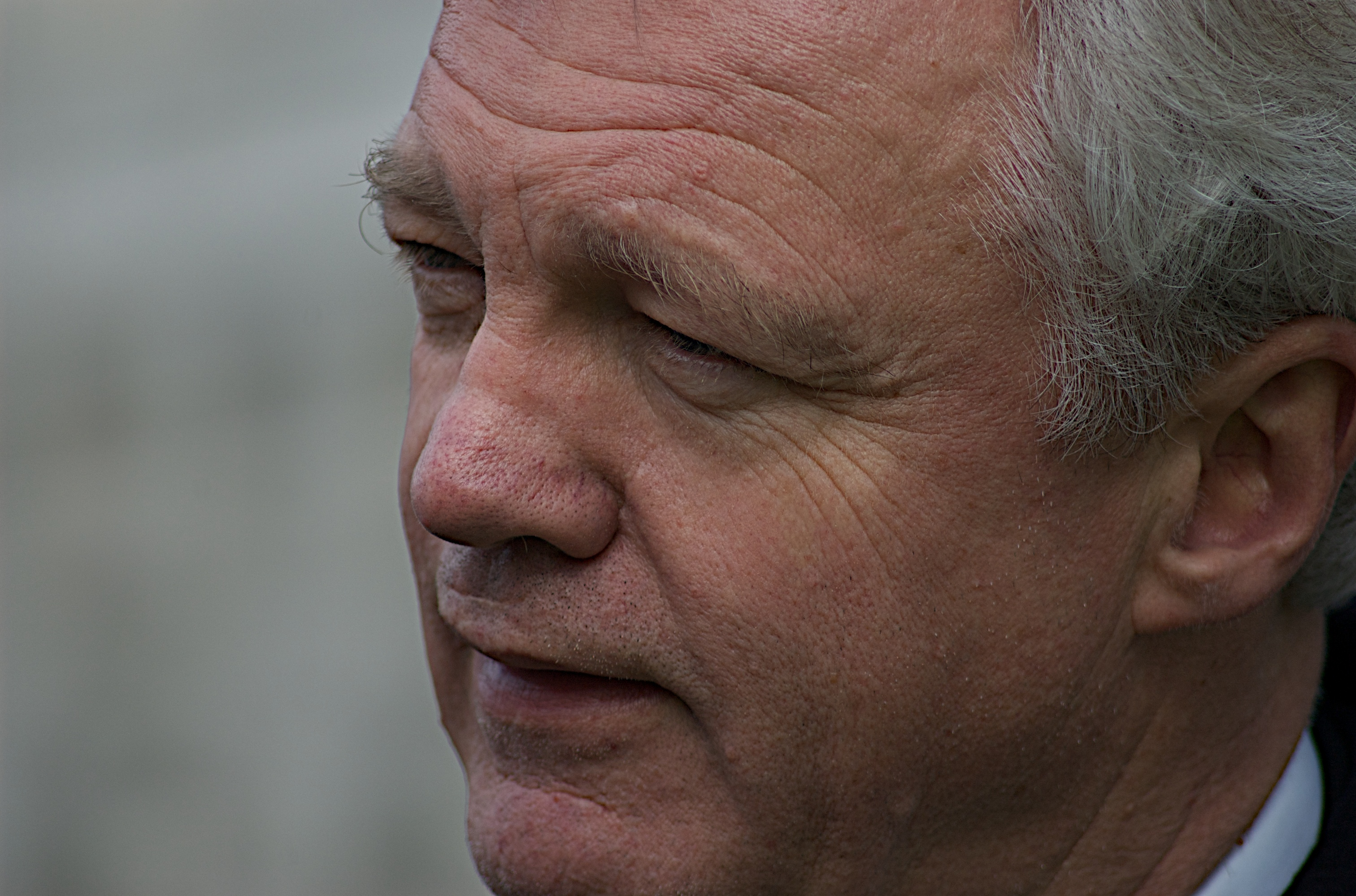
Davis in March 2008

On 12 June 2008, Davis resigned from the Shadow Cabinet and announced his resignation as an MP, in order to force a by-election, and cause a wider debate on the single issue of what he believed to be the erosion of civil liberties. On 18 June 2008, he resigned from the House of Commons. He stood as the Conservative Party candidate for his current seat in the subsequent by-election. The announcement came a day after the narrow passing of a parliamentary vote on the Counter-Terrorism Bill, which would extend the limit on the period of detention of terror suspects without charge in England and Wales, from 28 to 42 days. Davis won re-election with an increased vote share of 71.6% and an increased majority of 15,355 votes, but neither the Labour Party nor the Liberal Democrats put up a candidate. As is common at by-elections, voter turnout declined significantly from the previous general election to 34%.

At the time of Davis's resignation, the Labour MP Andy Burnham made a speech which was widely interpreted as falsely implying an inappropriate relationship between Davis and the then Director of Liberty, Shami Chakrabarti. Burnham was forced to issue a public apology under threat of legal action. As a backbench MP, Davis continued campaigning for civil liberties. He participated in the Convention on Modern Liberty, where he gave the keynote speech on the convention's final day. He also spoke at the 2009 Guardian Hay Festival, where he criticised Labour's "illusory pursuit of an unobtainable security", and was well received by an overwhelmingly non-Conservative audience. On 15 June 2009, Davis gave the 2009 Magna Carta Lecture at Royal Holloway, University of London, in association with the Magna Carta Trust.

Davis supported civil liberties campaign group Big Brother Watch and in January 2010 he spoke with Tony Benn at the official launch. In 2012 he helped lead the opposition to Coalition plans to allow police and security services to extend their monitoring of the public's email and social media communications. He expressed concern with the findings of a VICE News investigation into the deployment of IMSI-catchers in London. In 2014, along with Labour MP Tom Watson, he challenged the government's introduction of the Data Retention and Investigatory Powers Act 2014 in the courts. Although Davis is a staunch Eurosceptic and has criticised the record of the European Court of Human Rights, he has also argued against withdrawal from the court's jurisdiction, on the basis it might encourage countries with far worse civil liberties to do likewise.

Davis has been outspoken over UK government data deals, particularly those with Palantir Technologies. In 2021 Davis said of Palantir's involvement with the NHS, "Patient trust is vital to our NHS, so foreign tech companies such as Palantir, with their history of supporting mass surveillance, assisting in drone strikes, immigration raids and predictive policing, must not be placed at the heart of our NHS." Davis again criticised Palantir's involvement with the NHS in 2023 during the procurement process for a £480 million contract for a company to create a Federated Data Platform for NHS England. Davis has taken more conservative stances on some other civil liberties issues, having repeatedly voted to restrict abortion, fertility treatment and embryo research. He also repeatedly voted against the furthering of LGBT rights, including supporting the controversial Section 28, which banned teachers from "promoting homosexuality" or "teaching ... the acceptability of homosexuality as a pretended family relationship", and opposing the legalisation of same-sex marriage saying it was "not an issue of rights but a clash of beliefs".

=== Opposition to torture ===
During a House of Commons debate on 7 July 2009, Davis gave a speech in which he accused the Brown ministry and, more broadly speaking, the government with knowing about and being complicit with torture carried out by foreign intelligence agencies. Davis said that in 2008 at least 15 British citizens had been tortured by foreign intelligence services with the alleged complicity of the government's intelligence agencies, citing the cases of (among others) Binyam Mohammed, Moazzam Begg, Rangzieb Ahmed and Rashid Rauf. Davis said during the speech that in "each case, the Government have denied complicity, but at the same time fiercely defended the secrecy of their actions, making it impossible to put the full facts in the public domain, despite the clear public interest in doing so." Davis was amongst the signatories of a 2012 letter to The Guardian which condemned what it alleged to be the Cameron–Clegg coalition's attempt via a new Justice and Security Green Paper to prevent the exposure of "British complicity in kidnap and torture".

=== Coalition government (2010–2015) ===
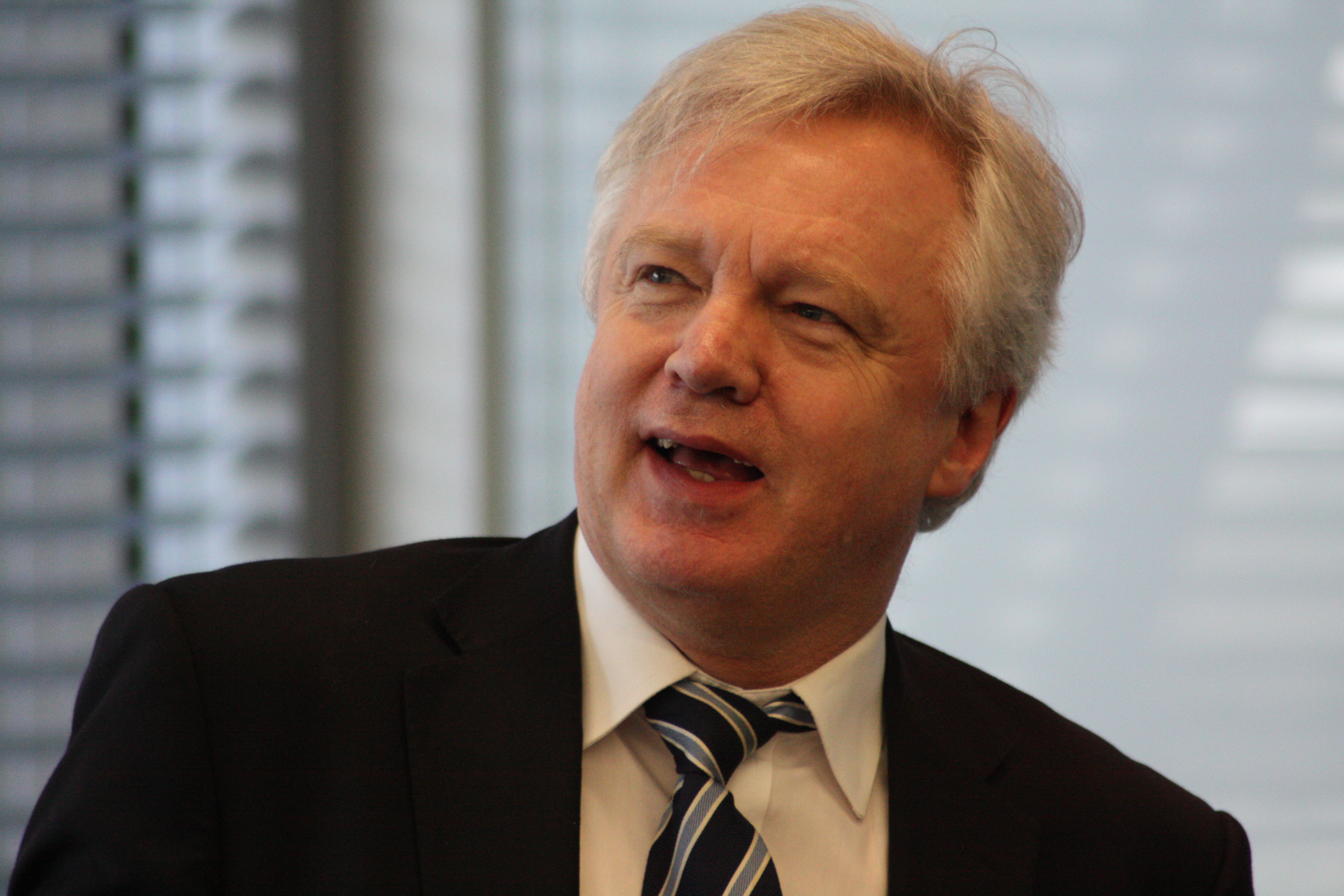
Davis in 2010

Davis was again re-elected at the 2010 general election, with a decreased vote share of 50.2% and a decreased majority of 11,602 votes. In May 2010, with the result of a hung parliament, it was reported that David Cameron wanted to invite Davis and other right-wingers such as Michael Howard and Iain Duncan Smith into his Conservative–Liberal Democrat coalition cabinet. However, Davis declined and remained a critic of the government on its stance on tuition fees. In January 2011, along with Jack Straw, he secured a vote in the Commons to challenge a ruling by the European Court of Human Rights that prisoners should be allowed to vote and MPs subsequently chose to ignore the ruling. He offered critical commentary on the coalition in a BBC interview in March 2012.

In 2012, together with Liam Fox, Davis founded Conservative pressure group Conservative Voice to amplify the voice of grassroots members, which Davis thought was getting lost in the party. In a November 2012 speech, he urged David Cameron to hold a referendum on the UK's membership of the EU by 2014. He suggested to hold two votes, the first where voters would be asked whether they wanted to renegotiate current EU arrangements, and a second where they would be asked to either accept a renegotiated deal or leave the EU altogether. At the 2015 general election, Davis was again re-elected, with an increased vote share of 54.2% and an increased majority of 16,195. Also in 2015, he was one of seven Conservative MPs to defy the whip and vote against bombing Syria.

=== Secretary of State for Exiting the European Union (2016–2018) ===
Following Theresa May's appointment as prime minister, Davis was appointed Secretary of State for Exiting the European Union (Brexit Secretary) on 13 July 2016. In his role as Brexit Secretary, Davis announced that Parliament would take action on translating EU laws into British laws as part of the process of Withdrawal from the European Union. Davis stated that the Brexit timetable discussion would be the "row of the summer" during a TV interview with Robert Peston on Peston on Sunday. The timetable was set on the first day of negotiations and it was dictated by the EU. Following the Article 50 vote in February 2017, Davis was involved in a controversy with fellow MP Diane Abbott.

Davis was again re-elected at the snap 2017 general election with an increased vote share of 61% and a decreased majority of 15,405 votes. On 7 September 2017, the European Commission published the minutes of a meeting in July at which Michel Barnier, the EU's chief Brexit negotiator, briefed the commission on the outcome of his first round of talks with Davis. Barnier expressed concern about Davis's commitment to the talks (he had been going to Brussels for the start and end of each round of talks, but had not been staying there for the duration).

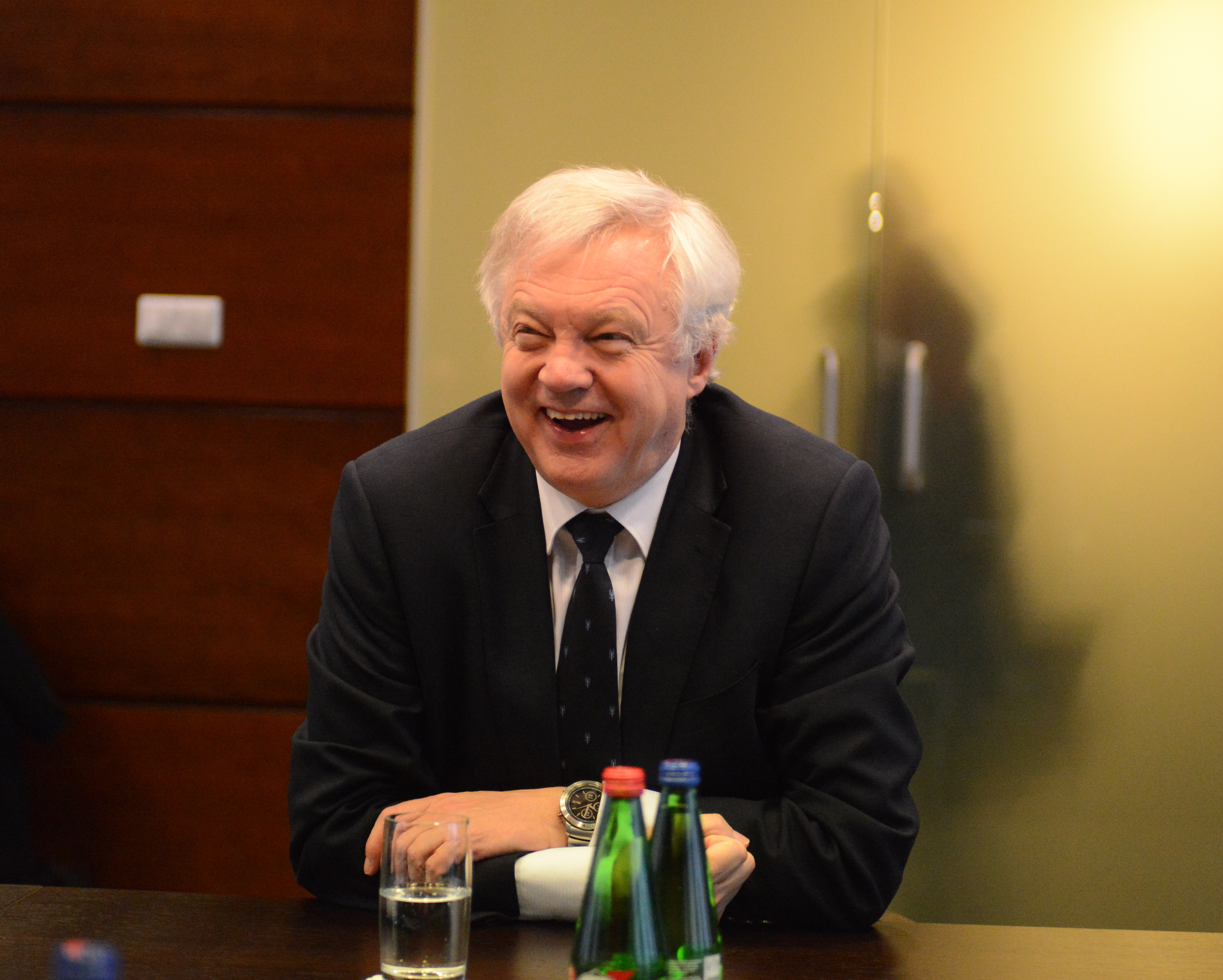
Davis as Secretary of State for Exiting the European Union in 2017

In November 2017, Davis acknowledged that the negotiations with the EU were difficult, but appealed to European countries not to "put politics above prosperity", implying that by doing so, countries like Germany would harm their own economies. He blamed Germany and France for blocking trade negotiations. Davis also argued that the UK and the EU should agree a free trade deal more comprehensive in scope than "any the EU has agreed before".

Some politicians were angry because reports about the potential effect of Brexit on 58 economic sectors were severely edited before Davis gave them to the Exiting the European Union Select Committee. They maintained Davis – and by implication Theresa May's government – chose to disregard a binding and unanimous vote from MPs requiring the information to be provided in full. Davis later appeared to contradict his earlier assurances that impact analyses had been carried out when he said the government had not produced any economic forecasts of what would happen after the UK leaves the EU.

David was sidelined in December 2017, mid-way through the negotiations, with the Prime Minister's Europe Adviser Olly Robbins taking charge of negotiations. In January 2018, former Irish Prime Minister Bertie Ahern said Davis did not understand the implications of Brexit for Ireland's border with Northern Ireland. On 8 July 2018, Davis resigned as Brexit Secretary as he did not "believe" in the Prime Minister's Chequers plan for Brexit. Following Davis's resignation, Steve Baker and Boris Johnson also resigned.

=== Return to the backbenches ===
==== In government ====
On 20 November 2018, Davis was criticised by the Liberal Democrat MP Layla Moran, of the pro-EU group Best for Britain, for suggesting that the UK could negotiate a free trade agreement during a post-Brexit "transition period" without first having successfully negotiated a withdrawal agreement with the European Union. Following Theresa May's resignation in May 2019, Davis supported Dominic Raab as the next leader of the Conservative Party. Davis was again re-elected at the 2019 general election, with an increased vote share of 62.4% and an increased majority of 20,329 votes. He has opposed the proposed extradition of Julian Assange to the United States. Davis has also been prominent in opposing the plans of the Johnson administration to privatise NHS data, advocating more transparency in the management of patient data.

On 17 March 2021, Davis used parliamentary privilege to criticise the Scottish Government's investigation into allegations of sexual misconduct by former First Minister Alex Salmond. Davis, a close personal friend of Salmond, told MPs during a Commons debate that there had been a "concerted effort" by SNP officials to encourage complainers to come forward, and that Nicola Sturgeon's chief of staff, Liz Lloyd, had been involved in the civil service investigation into Salmond in February 2018 – months before Nicola Sturgeon claimed to have known about the investigation. He told the House of Commons, "I have it on good authority that there exists from 6th Feb 2018 an exchange of messages between civil servants suggesting that the first minister's chief of staff is interfering in the complaints process against Alex Salmond. If true this suggests the chief of staff had knowledge of the case in February, not April as she has claimed." Nicola Sturgeon rejected Davis's claims, and one of the women who had accused Salmond of sexual harassment issued a statement through Rape Crisis Scotland calling Davis's claims "fundamentally untrue".

During Prime Minister's Questions on 19 January 2022, Davis asked Prime Minister Boris Johnson to resign, after expressing dissatisfaction with his response to Partygate. He quoted what Leo Amery (alluding to Oliver Cromwell) had said to Prime Minister Neville Chamberlain in 1940: "You have sat there too long for all the good you have done. In the name of God, go." On 2 October 2022, Davis wrote an article in The Daily Telegraph which advocated for reform of the National Health Service and the adoption of a social insurance-based system. He wrote that the NHS was "plagued by ineffective bureaucracy" and that structural reform did not mean that the principles of the NHS being universal and free at the point of delivery needed to be abandoned.

==== In opposition ====
Due to the 2023 review of Westminster constituencies, Davis's constituency of Haltemprice and Howden was abolished, and replaced with Goole and Pocklington. At the 2024 general election, which the Labour Party won, Davis was elected to Parliament as MP for Goole and Pocklington with 38.2% of the vote and a majority of 3,572. Since May 2024, Davis has expressed doubts about the conviction of former nurse Lucy Letby and has said he intends to thoroughly research the issue and discuss it in parliament. On 18 July 2024, Davis again used parliamentary privilege to name Liz Lloyd, Nicola Sturgeon's ex-chief of staff, as the person responsible for leaking sexual misconduct allegations against Alex Salmond to the Daily Record in 2018.

Speaker of the House of Commons Lindsay Hoyle announced an emergency debate on the scandal surrounding Peter Mandelson's relationship with sex offender Jeffrey Epstein in the House of Commons, secured by Davis. He has accused Starmer of poor judgment, questioned the integrity of the vetting process, and highlighted what he calls a double standard applied to "Labour royalty".

== Personal life ==
Davis met his wife, Doreen Cook, at Warwick. They married on 28 July 1973 and have three children.

Davis was a close personal friend of former leader of the Scottish National Party and First Minister of Scotland Alex Salmond, and twice used parliamentary privilege to criticise the Scottish Government's investigation into allegations of sexual misconduct by Salmond. When Salmond died in 2024, Davis paid tribute to him as "one of the great politicians of his age" and "a great leader for his country".

In December 2023, Davis fought off street attackers who were kicking a man, near Parliament. He was appointed a Knight Commander of the Order of the Bath (KCB) in the 2023 Political Honours for public and political service.

Parliament of the United Kingdom
| Preceded by Paul Bryan | Member of Parliament for Boothferry; 1987–1997 | Constituency abolished |
| New constituency | Member of Parliament for Haltemprice and Howden; 1997–2008 | Succeeded by Himself |
| Preceded by Himself | Member of Parliament for Haltemprice and Howden; 2008–2024 | Constituency abolished |
| New constituency | Member of Parliament for Goole and Pocklington; 2024–present | Incumbent |
Political offices
| Preceded by David Heathcoat-Amory | Minister of State for Europe; 1994–1997 | Succeeded by Doug Henderson |
| Preceded by Robert Sheldon | Chair of the Public Accounts Committee; 1997–2001 | Succeeded by Edward Leigh |
| Preceded by Eric Pickles as Shadow Secretary of State for Local Government and the Regions | Shadow Secretary of State for the Office of the Deputy Prime Minister; 2002–2003 | Succeeded by Eric Pickles as Shadow Secretary of State for Local Government |
| Preceded by Eric Pickles as Shadow Secretary of State for Local Government and the Regions | Shadow Secretary of State for the Office of the Deputy Prime Minister; 2002–2003 | Succeeded by Bernard Jenkin as Shadow Secretary of State for the Regions |
| Preceded by Oliver Letwin | Shadow Home Secretary; 2003–2008 | Succeeded by Dominic Grieve |
| New office | Secretary of State for Exiting the European Union; 2016–2018 | Succeeded by Dominic Raab |
Party political offices
| Preceded by Michael Ancram | Chairman of the Conservative Party; 2001–2002 | Succeeded by Theresa May |
