= Smoking bans in the United Kingdom =

A no smoking sign asserting that smoking would break the law

A smoking ban in England, making it illegal to smoke in all enclosed workplaces in England, came into force in July 2007 as a consequence of the Health Act 2006. Similar bans had already been introduced by the rest of the United Kingdom: in Scotland in March 2006, Wales in April 2007 and Northern Ireland in April 2007. A smoking ban in cars with passengers under 18 in England and Wales were introduced under Children and Families Act 2014.

== Before the smoking ban ==
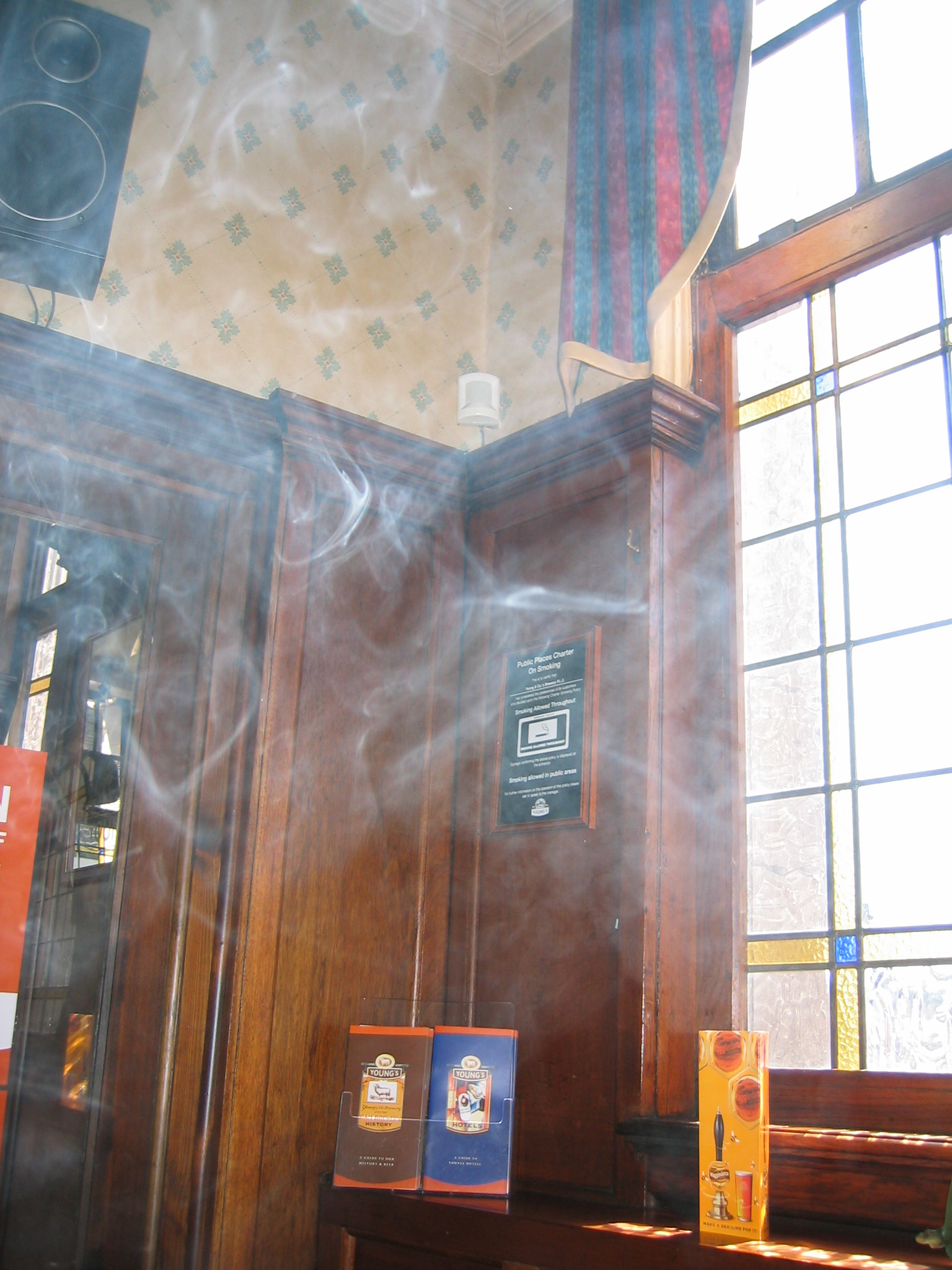
Before the ban, smoking was commonplace in pubs.

Before the ban many businesses voluntarily introduced bans on smoking mainly as a result of public feedback. The pub chain Wetherspoons was the first major chain to introduce a complete ban on indoor smoking, doing so in May 2006.

== Passage of the law ==
On 16 November 2004, a Public Health white paper proposed a smoking ban in almost all public places in England and Wales. Smoking restrictions would be phased in, with a ban on smoking in NHS and government buildings by 2006, in enclosed public places by 2007, and pubs, bars and restaurants (except pubs not serving food) by the end of 2008.

On 26 October 2005, after external challenge and debates within the Cabinet, the UK Government announced that it would continue with its plans. All workplaces, including restaurants and pubs selling food, would have to comply by summer 2007. However, there was widespread criticism from all sides of the debate on the subject, with a number of MPs threatening to try to overturn the bill. Many representatives of the pub trade told the Government that only a total ban would work, and over 90 MPs signed a motion demanding this, with over 100 signing a petition for a free vote on the issue. It was reported on 24 November that Chief Medical Officer Liam Donaldson nearly quit over the partial ban, but decided to stay to champion a total ban. On the same day, the government released the results of the public consultation, after Cancer Research UK demanded them under the Freedom of Information Act, which revealed that nearly 9 out of 10 respondents wanted a total ban.

On 11 January 2006, the government further announced that it would give MPs a free vote on an amendment to the Health Bill, submitted by the Health select committee, to instigate a comprehensive smoke-free workplace regulations. Health Secretary Patricia Hewitt voted in favour of the amendment and, in so doing, voted against her own department's then publicly stated policy (i.e. the proposed partial regulations). All other parties had offered free votes on the issue which was debated on 14 February, with three options: the present compromise, a total ban, or an exemption for members' clubs only.

On 14 February 2006, the House of Commons first voted on the amendment to the original compromise plan, to extend the ban to all enclosed public places except private members' clubs. The amendment was carried with a large majority. MPs then voted on a further amendment to ban smoking in all enclosed public places including private members' clubs. Again this amendment gained significant support and was carried with a large majority. This therefore replaced the earlier successful amendment which would have allowed smoking only in private members' clubs. The legislation was passed by the House of Lords, allowing a total smoking ban in enclosed public places to come into force in England.

Political opposition did not entirely disappear at this point, the House of Lords Economic Affairs Committee accused the Government of overreacting to the threat posed by passive smoking and said that the smoking ban was symptomatic of MPs' failure to understand risk on 7 June 2006.

== Implementation ==
The ban came into force at 06:00 BST on 1 July 2007, as announced on 30 November 2006 by former Secretary of State for Health Patricia Hewitt, who called it "a huge step forward for public health".

A legal blunder, however, by Stoke-on-Trent City Council meant that, while the smoking ban still applied in the city, the council were unable to issue fines to people caught flouting the law until 16 July 2007. The blunder caused the city to briefly be dubbed Smoke-on-Trent.

== Following the passing of the law ==
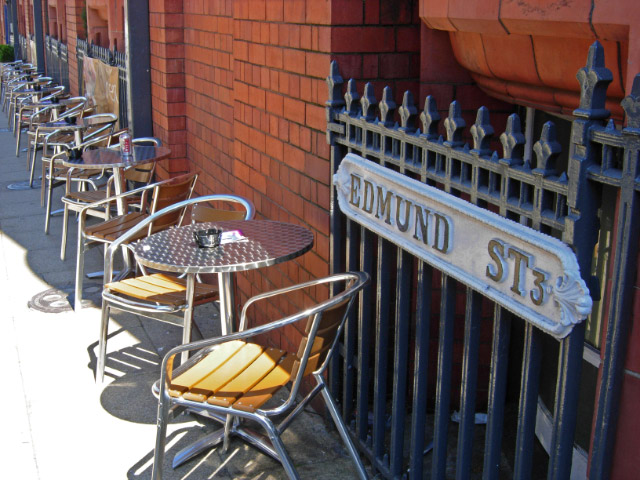
Many pubs provide smoking areas outdoors, where smoking remains generally permitted.

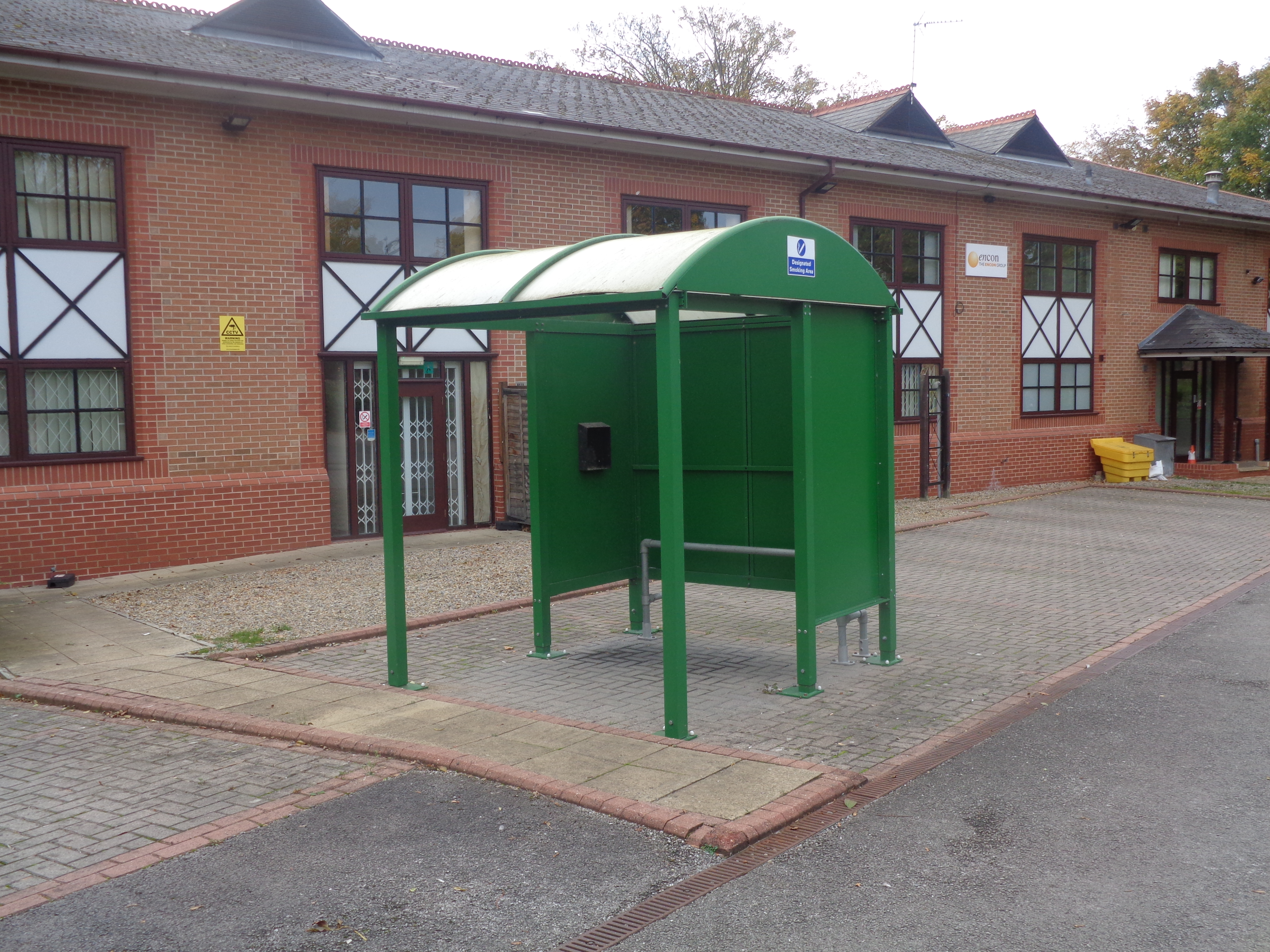
A smoking shelter outside an office building in England. Since 2007 such shelters have become commonplace at workplaces.

On 30 June 2010, the recently formed Coalition Government announced that it would not be reviewing the ban. An attempt in October 2010 by Conservative MP David Nuttall to amend the law to exempt private members' clubs and pubs from the smoking ban was defeated in the House of Commons on its first reading.

== Exemptions from the law ==
While the ban affects almost all indoor workplaces, some exemptions were provided:

- designated hotel rooms
- designated rooms in nursing homes
- designated rooms in prisons (until 18 July 2018) (Note: The ban was technically enabled by Prison Act 1952 rather than Health Act 2006.)
- designated rooms in offshore oil rigs
- designated rooms in mental health units (until 1 July 2008)
- specialist tobacconists in relation to sampling cigars and/or pipe tobacco.

In England, Wales and Northern Ireland, in theatres and television studios, actors and actresses can smoke tobacco on theatre stages or on television sets if the artistic integrity makes it appropriate. However, once the person leaves the stage or set, the item must be stubbed out. Normal smoking laws exist for all other parts of the theatre or television studio, including green rooms, rehearsal rooms and dressing rooms. There have been calls for this exemption to be scrapped, for the health of other actors and audiences. This exemption does not apply to Scotland, where smoking is completely banned in theatres. Comedian Mel Smith tried to defy the smoking ban by threatening to smoke a real cigar during a play about Winston Churchill during the 2006 Edinburgh Fringe; however, he stopped before lighting the cigar.

An exemption was also theoretically possible within the Palace of Westminster, as for other Royal Palaces, although members of the House of Commons and the House of Lords agreed to observe the spirit of the ban and restrict any smoking within the grounds of Parliament to four designated outside areas.

Smoking is permitted in a private residence, although not in areas used as a shared work-space. In flats with communal entrances or shared corridors, smoking is not permitted.

University halls of residence presented some dilemmas in practice as regards defining what is public and private. Several universities have imposed a blanket ban on smoking including halls of residence.

== Public transport ==
As part of the implementation of the smoking ban, Transport for London announced that smoking would no longer be permitted in taxis, private hire vehicles and all London Buses premises, including all bus stop shelters. London Underground had already implemented a smoking ban on all its property (including all its station platforms, whether underground or not) much earlier, on 23 November 1987, as a result of the King's Cross fire five days before, likely caused by a discarded match.

The Association of Train Operating Companies and Network Rail introduced an extended ban on smoking covering all railway property including all National Rail station platforms whether enclosed or not. The ban has since been extended to cover the use of electronic cigarettes. Smoking on board trains was banned in 2005 when both GNER and First Caledonian Sleeper withdrew smoking accommodation from their services.

The Tyne and Wear Metro was the first public transport system to ban smoking in its entirety which has been enforced since the system first opened in 1980.

== Policing of the ban ==
The ban is enforced by Environmental Health Officers in England, who issue warnings and offer advice before resorting to punitive measures and have had to issue a low frequency of fines since the law came into force. However, there were some objectors who generated higher-profile legal cases, for instance Hugh Howitt, also known as Hamish Howitt, the landlord of the Happy Scots Bar in Blackpool who was the first landlord to be prosecuted for permitting smoking in a smoke-free place under his control. On 2 August 2007, Howitt appeared before Blackpool Magistrates' Court and pleaded not guilty to 12 counts of failing to stop people smoking in his pub. On 2 December 2008, Howitt effectively had his premises licence revoked, after an appeal by Blackpool Council was upheld; he was not allowed to appeal, and Howitt had to close the Delboys Bar following the decision.

There have been some incidents of violence perpetrated by people refusing to obey the ban, in one of which a former heavyweight boxer, James Oyebola, was shot in the head after he asked patrons at a nightclub to stop smoking and later died of his injuries. However, the view of enforcement authorities is that the smoke-free workplace regulations are simple to understand, popular, and as a result largely "self-policing". For a short while, bars in the UK that offered shisha (the smoking of flavoured tobacco through a pipe) were still allowed to provide their services inside the establishment; however, the ban covered this area in late 2007 leading to a rapid decline in shisha bars.

== Reaction to the ban ==
A group calling themselves "Freedom To Choose" launched a campaign for a judicial review of the smoke-free workplace regulations claiming a breach of the Human Rights Act 1998, as it does not respect the right to privacy of people who wish to smoke in public. Supporters of the regulations put forward counter-arguments positing that the rights of smokers to indulge in their habit cease as soon as it negatively affects other people in the vicinity. In 2010, pub landlord Nick Hogan was briefly jailed for an offence related to the smoking ban. In 2012, it was reported that "Five years after the introduction of the smoking ban in England, almost seven out of 10 licensees want the legislation amended to allow for separate smoking rooms in pubs".

A 2017 YouGov survey indicated growing support for the smoking ban, up to 83% from the 2007 figure of 78%. The ban was proving more popular among smokers where support had risen from 52% in 2009 to 64% in 2017.

== See also ==
- List of smoking bans
- Smokeasy
- FOREST
- Action on Smoking and Health
