= Wilberforce Institute for the Study of Slavery and Emancipation =

Research institute at the University of Hull

The Wilberforce Institute for the Study of Slavery and Emancipation is a research institute at the University of Hull, in Kingston upon Hull, England. Housed in Oriel Chambers in Hull City Centre, since 2005, its aim is to research slavery in the past and the present.

== History of the Institute ==
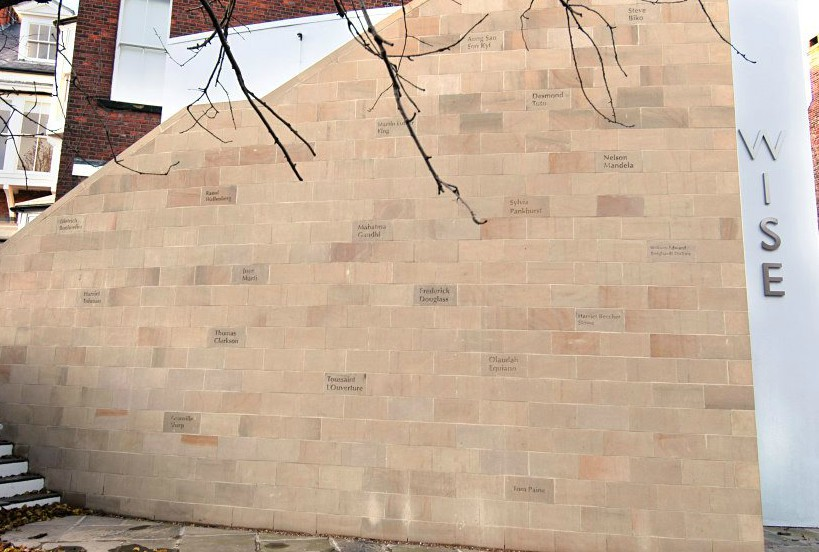
The "WISE Humanitarian Wall" displays the names of many prominent figures in the ongoing fight against slavery

The Wilberforce Institute for the Study of Slavery and Emancipation, located in Kingston upon Hull, England, was officially opened in 2006, to act as a research centre for academics in conjunction with the University of Hull. The patron of the institute is anti-apartheid figure, Archbishop Desmond Tutu, and the institute was opened by former President of Ghana, John Agyekum Kufuor. Funding was drawn through the European Regional Development Fund, Yorkshire Forward, and the Heritage Lottery Fund. The institute was opened in advance of celebrations marking the bicentenary of the Slave Trade Act 1807 which, through former Member of Parliament (MP) and major abolitionist movement figure William Wilberforce, the city of Hull has strong links to. The institute is a leading centre specialising in researching the history of slavery, whilst also serving as a research hub concerning contemporary slavery and human rights abuses in the present age. It aims to foster links with other universities worldwide, including prestigious American institutions, such as Yale, Harvard and Stanford. Its exhibitions profile the city's links with Africa, and especially with the city of Freetown, Sierra Leone. As part of the University of Hull, the institute often holds public lectures on the subjects of both historical and contemporary slavery, including the annual Alderman Sydney Smith lecture, so-named after the former Labour MP for Kingston upon Hull South West, Sydney Smith. The institute is housed in the historic Oriel Chambers building, next to the historical home of William Wilberforce, himself.

In 2014, the institute was a part of "the Long Walk to Freedom", a series of artworks within the historic Old Town area of Hull, as part of the annual Freedom Festival. In 2015, it was announced that the institute had been awarded the Queen's Anniversary Prize for Further and Higher Education for its "research applied in combating modern forms of slavery".

=== Wilberforce Institute's Humanitarian Wall ===
The Wilberforce Institute's "Humanitarian Wall" commemorates important figures, both historical and contemporary, from the struggle against slavery.

Described as "a unique tribute to many of the famous names throughout history which are synonymous with the fight for emancipation and freedom", the Wall displays the names of:

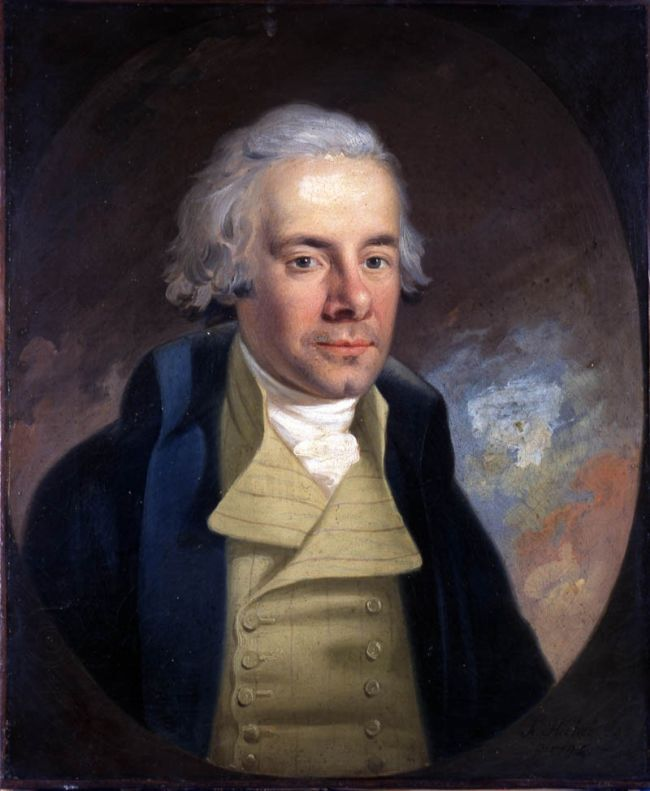
Former Hull MP and major abolitionist William Wilberforce gives his name to the institute

- Steve Biko (1946–1977)
- Dietrich Bonhoeffer (1906–1945)
- Thomas Clarkson (1760–1846)
- Frederick Douglass (1818–1895)
- William Edward Burghardt Du Bois (1868–1963)
- Olaudah Equiano (1745–1997)
- Mahatma Gandhi (1869–1948)
- Toussaint L'Ouverture (c. 1743–1803)
- Martin Luther King Jr. (1929–1968)
- Abraham Lincoln (1809–1865)
- Nelson Mandela (1918–2014)
- José Martí (1853–1995)
- Edmund Dene Morel (1873–1924)
- Thomas Paine (1737–1809)
- Sylvia Pankhurst (1882–1960)
- Rosa Parks (1913–2005)
- Granville Sharp (1735–1813)
- Harriet Beecher Stowe (1811–1896)
- Harriet Tubman (1820–1913)
- Desmond Tutu (1931–2021)
- Raoul Wallenberg (1912–1947)
- William Wilberforce (1759–1833)

The wall faces Mandela Gardens that were opened in May 1983 by Sir Shridath Ramphal. The gardens were named after the anti-Apartheid prisoner Nelson Mandela who later served as President of South Africa.

The US Ambassador to the United Kingdom, Matthew Barzun, was photographed paying his respects at the wall during a tour of Hull in early 2015, also commenting that "Wilberforce is a name known around the world and I am sure it is something Hull can use in promoting the city during 2017".
