= Grotrian =

Grotrian may refer to:

== People ==
- Frederick Brent Grotrian (1838–1905) was an English Member of Parliament
- Herbert Grotrian (1870–1951), English Member of Parliament
- Walter Grotrian (1890–1954), German astronomer and astrophysicist

== Other uses ==
- Grotrian (crater), a lunar crater
- Grotrian baronets, a title in the Baronetage of the United Kingdom
- Grotrian diagram, in chemistry
- Grotrian-Steinweg, a German piano brand known as Grotrian in the U.S.
