= William Botterill and Son =

British architectural firm

William Botterill & Son
- Industry: Architectural design
- Headquarters: Kingston upon Hull

William Botterill and Son was a prominent Kingston upon Hull architectural practice.

The practice was founded by William Botterill (1820–1903), who worked with his son William Henry Botterill (1851–79), and after 1881 with John Bilson (1858–1943) as Botterill and Bilson.

== History ==
William Botterill came to Hull in 1848 as clerk of works for the new Royal Station Hotel and set up an architectural practice in 1851. His son William Henry (1851–79) was also a partner in his practice. John Bilson, (Note: Bilson is better known for his work as an historian of medieval architecture and is considered one authority on Cistertian architecture. (See main article John Bilson (architect))) trained at the practice and became a partner in 1881. Botterill's son William Henry died early in 1879 and Bilson subsequently became the main partner in the practice, taking over the business when Botterill retired in 1899.

The firm's commissions included chapels, houses, banks, offices, industrial buildings: commissions included the schools for the Hull School Board, with Botterill initially producing Gothic Revival designs, and later designs in the Queen Anne revival style by Bilson. Botterill designed the Newland Park Estate in Hull in 1877, though most of its houses were developed after his death. Oriel Chambers (now the home of the Wilberforce Institute for the study of Slavery and Emancipation) were built in 1879. Bilson's work included the Jacobean style Hymers College (1893), the Boulevard Higher Grade School (1895), and classically styled buildings for the Hull Savings Bank built in the 1920s and after.

William Botterill, Botterill, Son & Billson, and Botterill & Billson works
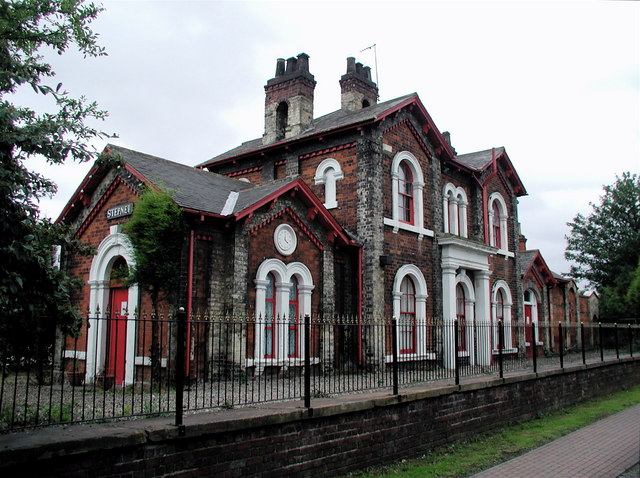
Stepney railway station house, Hull. 1853

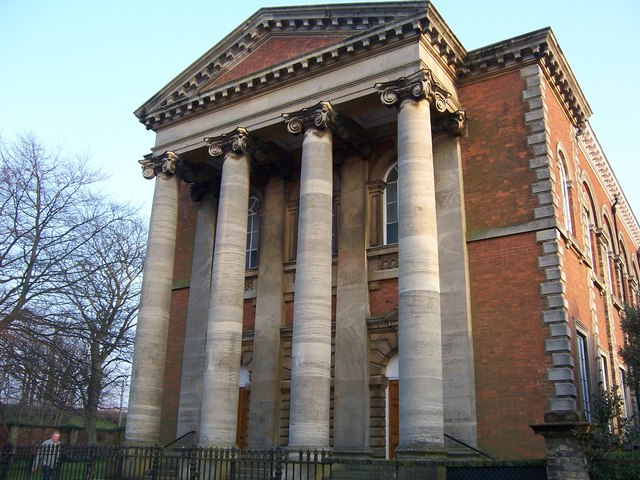
Centenary Methodist Chapel, Market Rasen. 1863

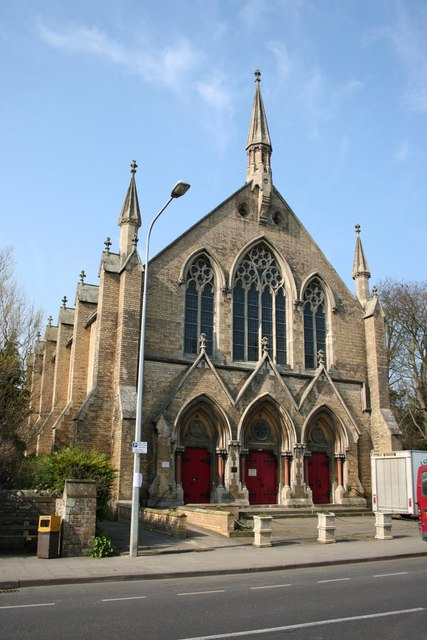
Methodist Chapel, Alford. 1864

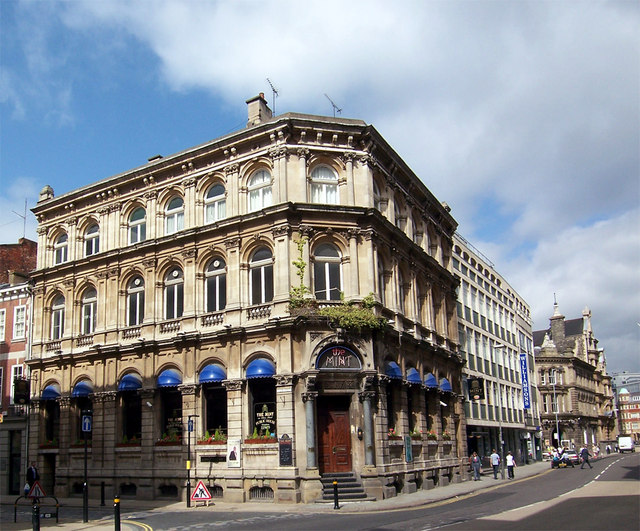
Midland Bank, Hull. 1869–70

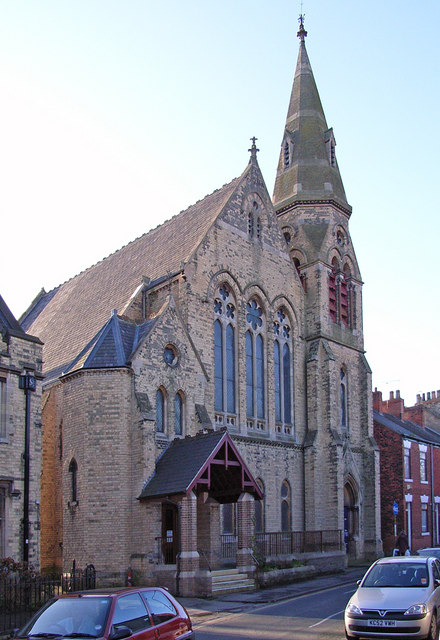
Tower Hill Methodist Church, Hessle. 1875-6

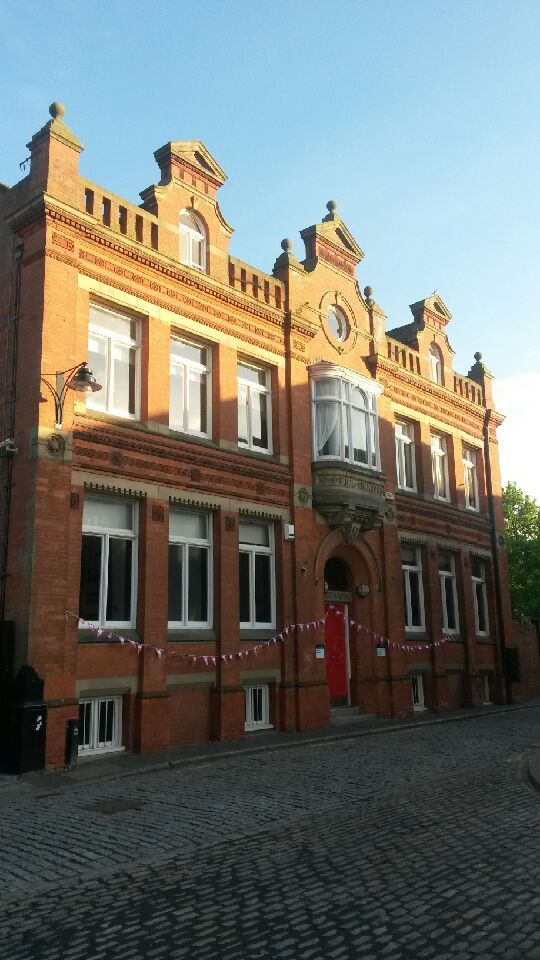
Oriel Chambers, Hull. 1879

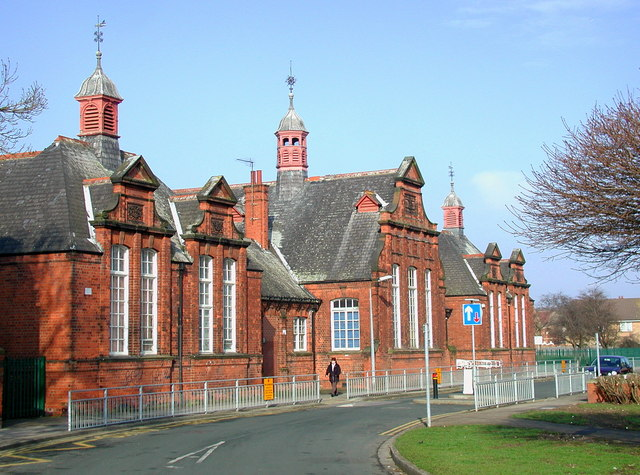
Newington primary school, Hull. 1885

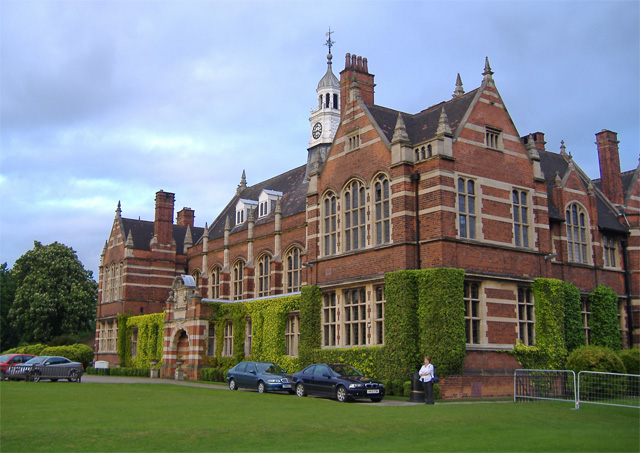
Hymers College, Hull. 1893

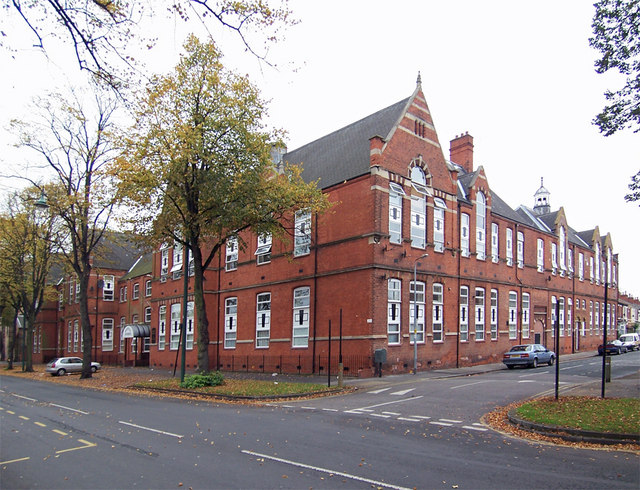
Boulevard Higher School, Hull. 1893

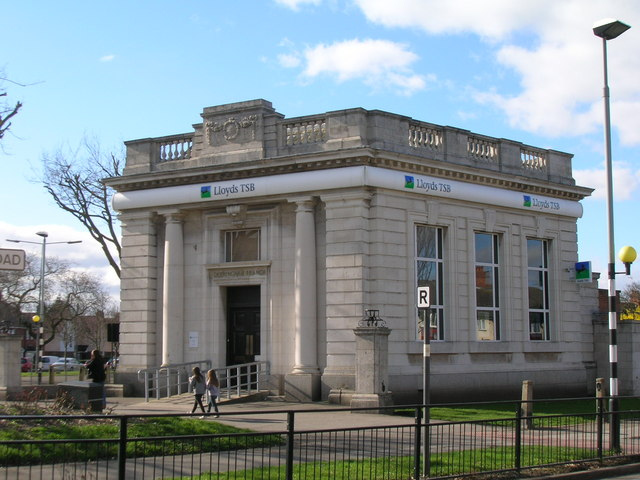
Hull Savings Bank (Derringham Bank branch), Hull. 1936

Listed and other buildings, non-exhaustive list

=== William Botterill ===
- Stepney Station House, Hull (1853).
- Centenary Methodist Chapel (1863).
- Methodist Chapel and Sunday School, Alford, Lincolnshire. (1864).
- Exchange Buildings, Lowgate, Hull (1866).
- 32, Silver Street, Hull (1869–70).
- Offices. 2, Manor Street, Hull (1870).
- Kings Market, South Church Side, Market Place, Hull (1875).
- Oriel Chambers, Hull (1879).
- Charterhouse School, Hull (1881).
- Newington Primary School (1885) and adjoining nursery (1898), Hull.
- Stepney Infants School, Hull (1886).

=== John Bilson ===
- All Saints' Church, Bolton Percy, North Yorkshire. (originally 14th century, restored 1905 by Bilson)
- Pickering Hall, Hull (1914)
- Lloyds Bank, Silver Street, Hull (1912).
- St Helen's Church, Escrick (orig. 1857, restored 1923 by Bilson).

=== Demolished works ===
- "1882 – Church of St. Phillip, Trippet, Kingston upon Hull, Yorkshire", archiseek.com, 26 January 2012 ; red brick early English gothic revival (built 1881–2)
- Former Methodist Church in Chapel Street, Bridlington ; Wesleyan chapel, white brick and stone, neoclassical (built 1873, dem.2004)

== See also ==
- Cuthbert Brodrick, Alfred Gelder, contemporary Hull architects
