= Oriel Chambers, Kingston upon Hull =

Building in Kingston upon Hull, England

Coordinates: 53°44′39″N 0°19′49″W

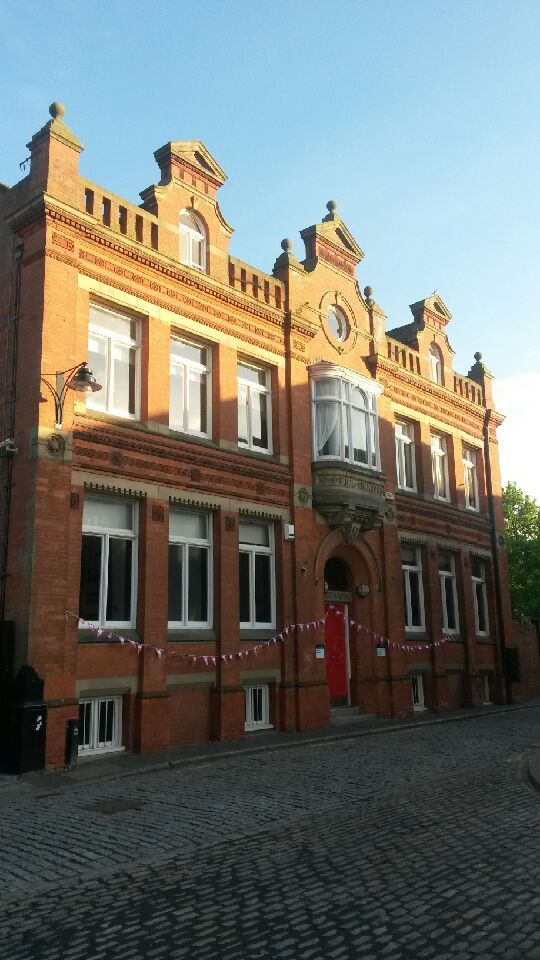
The front entrance to Oriel Chambers showing the oriel window overhanging the High Street

Oriel Chambers is a Grade II listed building which, since 2006, has housed the Wilberforce Institute for the study of Slavery and Emancipation. It is located in the city of Kingston upon Hull, in the East Riding of Yorkshire, England.

== History ==
=== Background to the building ===
Built in 1879 to the designs of William Botterill and Son. It is a brick building with tile and terracotta detail, with dormers and shaped gables. It takes its name from the oriel window on the first floor, the window that stands proud of the facade.

The site of Oriel Chambers lies within a much older tenement on the east side of the High Street, in the heart of the historic core of the Old Town of Hull. This particular plot of land was held by Robert de Dripole in 1293. In 1339 the property was split into two, and a deed of that year records a Basement in which a widow lived, with a 9 feet wide passageway or "free entry" to the west of the said Basement. In the 1347 rental, a tenement was held by John Lambert for 7s per year. A messuage is recorded here in 1374. By 1448 this holding had become one messuage and three tenements, whilst at the Lowgate (Marketgate) end of the property, a chamber and a hospice were erected to serve as a hospital.

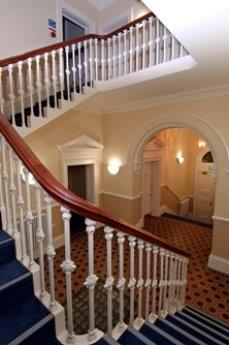
Renovated interior of Oriel Chambers

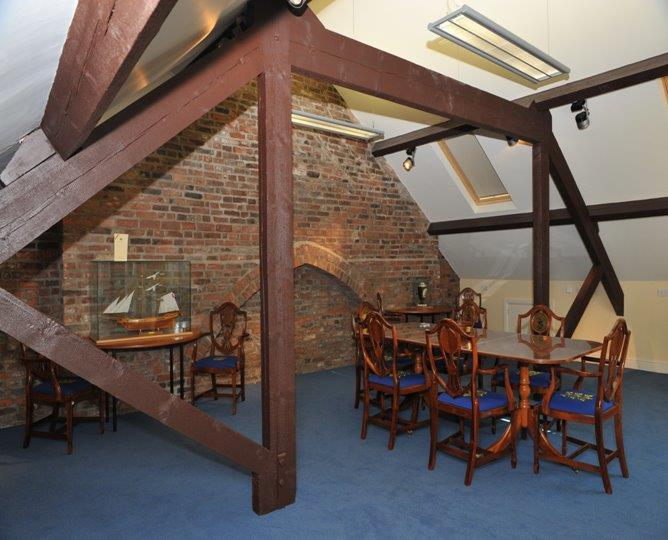
An example of the architecture within the building

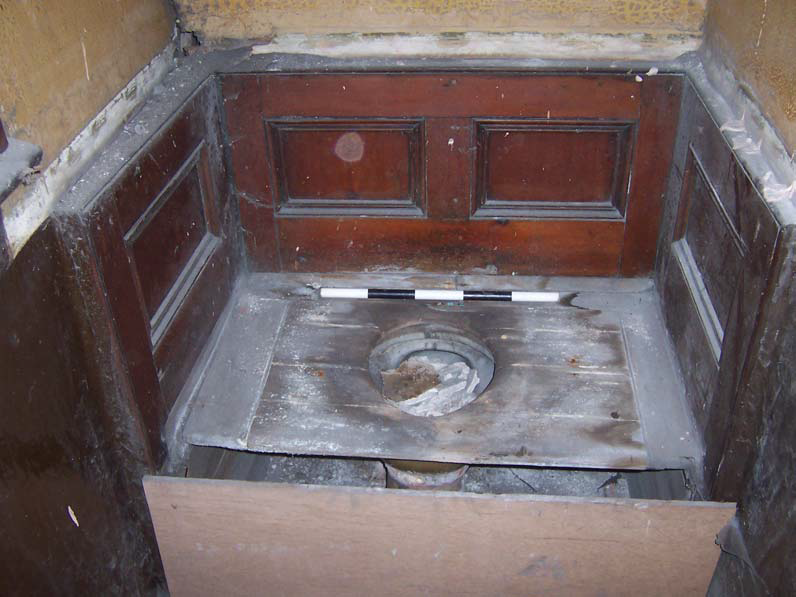
Original sanitary provision from 1879 situated on the top floor of Oriel Chambers before renovation work in 2006

In 1455 two new houses were erected on the site, bringing the total to six. Repairs in that year mention a kitchen and a brewhouse. The 1465 Town Rental lists, in addition to the capital messuage and five tenements mentioned earlier, a garden at the end of the tenements which is now assigned to the tenement in Chapel Lane: this almost certainly refers to the east side of High Street. The descent of the property on the east side of High Street is not well documented in the medieval period. The sinuous line of the street suggests that it developed originally as a river frontage for the properties to the west, and that subsequent development of the river bank gradually created a strip of land between the road and the river. Certainly by 1622, no.27 High Street had emerged as a recognisable property in the Elder Chamberlain's Rental. In that year it was held by Robert Williamson, and ‘the house wherein he dwells’ was specifically mentioned. A single house here continues to be mentioned in the rental returns up to 1711 – thereafter the rents for the property are regularly recorded, but no details of the dwelling are mentioned. In 1719 a deed refers to two messuages, with staiths, chambers and Basements on the east side of High Street.

In 1673 Robert Nettleton was assessed for five hearths here in the Hearth tax – showing that the house was a substantial property. In 1774 Marmaduke Clarke was assessed for 16 windows in the Window Tax – once again confirming the size and status of the house. In 1814 Frost and Moxon, rope-makers, are recorded as having premises at 27 High Street, whilst an 1817 document records a Levitt Quarton, merchant here. In 1837 and 1838 Sarah Cole, shop-keeper, had a house and shop on the site. The 1855 Poor Rate records both a house and offices. The 1853 OS map shows a large building on the site prior to the construction of Oriel Chambers. When this building was constructed has not been ascertained. The 1851 directory entry for 27 High Street, lists the occupants as Messrs Hewitt and Ablett, though the entry does not give their trades. By 1858, however, the property was occupied by Henry Fearnley, a shopkeeper and river broker. In 1861, Thomas Thompson, printer and stationer, is given as occupant, though by 1867, another firm of printers, Ash & Co., were in the building, and they are still listed as such in 1876.

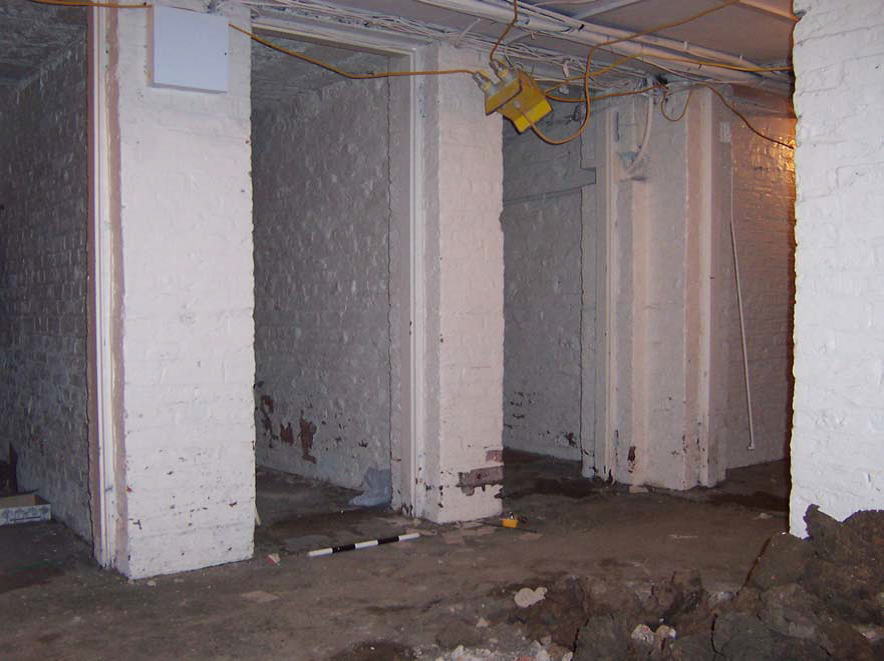
Architecture in the basement before renovation work in 2006

In 2000 an excavation was carried out by Humber Field Archaeology, to the south-east of Oriel Chambers and immediately to the north of Chapel Lane Staith. The excavation and a subsequent watching brief revealed a number of timber waterfront revetments dating from the late 15th or early 16th century, one of which was largely constructed from reused ship's timbers, the ship having been constructed from trees felled between 1394 and 1404. A chalk wharf surface was also recorded; however, no associated buildings were discovered. During the 17th century the waterfront was replaced, possibly with an open-work jetty. The remains of a number of phases of warehouse showed that the new wharf was in use until that warehouse collapsed in 1861. Extensive remains of the later 19th-century warehouse that replaced it were also present.

=== Wilberforce Institute ===
Since 2006, Oriel Chambers has been home to the Wilberforce Institute for the study of Slavery and Emancipation, which acts as a research centre for academics in conjunction with the University of Hull. The patron of the institute is anti-apartheid figure Archbishop Desmond Tutu and the institute was opened by former President of Ghana, John Agyekum Kufuor. Funding was drawn through the European Regional Development Fund, Yorkshire Forward, and the Heritage Lottery Fund. The institute was opened in advance of celebrations marking the bicentenary of the Slave Trade Act 1807 which, through former Member of Parliament and major abolitionist movement figure William Wilberforce, the city of Hull has strong links to. The institute is one of the leading centres specialising in researching the history of slavery, whilst also serving as a research hub concerning contemporary slavery and human rights abuses in the present age. It also aims to foster links with other universities worldwide, including prestigious American institutions such as Yale, Harvard and Stanford. Its exhibitions profile the city's links with Africa, and especially to the city of Freetown, Sierra Leone. As part of the University of Hull, the institute often holds public lectures on the subject of both historical and contemporary slavery, including the annual Alderman Sydney Smith lecture, so named after the former Labour MP for Kingston upon Hull South West, Sydney Smith.

In 2014, the institute was a part of 'the Long Walk to Freedom', a series of artworks within the historic Old Town area of Hull, as part of the annual Freedom Festival. In 2015 it was announced that the institute had been awarded the Queen's Anniversary Prize for Further and Higher Education for its 'research applied in combating modern forms of slavery'.

==== Humanitarian Wall ====
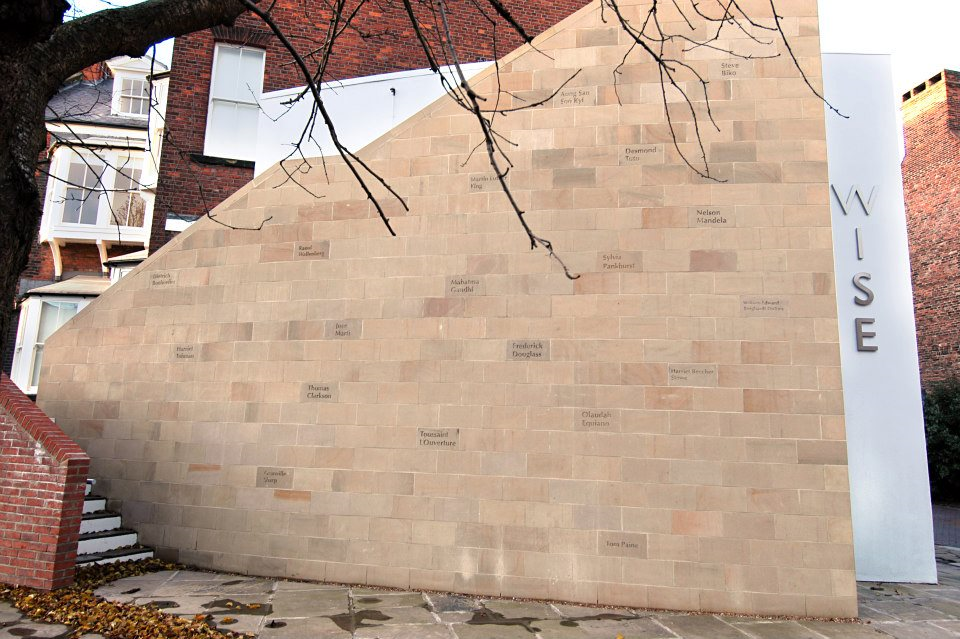
The WISE 'Humanitarian Wall' commemorates important figures, both historical and contemporary, from the struggle against slavery

Described as 'a unique tribute to many of the famous names throughout history which are synonymous with the fight for emancipation and freedom', the Wall displays the names of:

- Aung San Suu Kyi (born 1945)
- Steve Biko (1946–77)
- Dietrich Bonhoeffer (1906–45)
- Thomas Clarkson (1760–1846)
- Frederick Douglass (1818–95)
- William Edward Burghardt Du Bois (1868–1963)
- Olaudah Equiano (1745–97)
- Mahatma Gandhi (1869–1948)
- Toussaint L’Ouverture (c. 1743–1803)
- Martin Luther King (1929–68)
- Abraham Lincoln (1809–1865)
- Nelson Mandela (1918–2014)
- Jose Marti (1853–95)
- Edmund Dene Morel (1873–1924)
- Tom Paine (1737–1809)
- Sylvia Pankhurst (1882–1960)
- Rosa Parks (1913–2005)
- Granville Sharp (1735–1813)
- Harriet Beecher Stowe (1811–1896)
- Harriet Tubman (1820–1913)
- Desmond Tutu (1931–)
- Raoul Wallenberg (1912–47)
- William Wilberforce (1759–1833)

The wall faces Mandela Gardens that were opened in May 1983 by Sir Shridath Ramphal. The gardens were named after the anti-Apartheid prisoner Nelson Mandela who later served as President of South Africa.

The US Ambassador to the United Kingdom, Matthew Barzun, was photographed paying his respects at the wall during a tour of Hull in early 2015, also commenting that "Wilberforce is a name known around the world and I am sure it is something Hull can use in promoting the city during 2017".
