= Listed buildings in Bolton Percy =

Bolton Percy is a civil parish in the county of North Yorkshire, England. It contains ten listed buildings that are recorded in the National Heritage List for England. Of these, one is listed at Grade I, the highest of the three grades, one is at Grade II*, the middle grade, and the others are at Grade II, the lowest grade. The parish contains the village of Bolton Percy and the surrounding countryside. Most of the listed buildings are houses, and the others are a church, a sundial in the churchyard, a former gatehouse and a public house.

== Key ==
Grade	Criteria
I	Buildings of exceptional interest, sometimes considered to be internationally important
II*	Particularly important buildings of more than special interest
II	Buildings of national importance and special interest

== Buildings ==
Name and location	Photograph	Date	Notes	Grade
All Saints' Church; 53.86501°N 1.19283°W		Early 14th century	The church has been altered and extended through the centuries, including a restoration in 1905 by John Bilson. It is built in magnesian limestone with a stone slate roof, and consists of a nave, north and south aisles, a south porch, a chancel with a north vestry, and a west tower. The tower has three stages, a chamfered plinth, angle buttresses, a west doorway with a pointed arch and a hood mould, above which is a three-light window with a hood mould, three-light bell openings, and an embattled parapet with corner pinnacles. At the east end is a five-light Perpendicular window.	I
Gatehouse; 53.86469°N 1.19327°W		15th century	The gatehouse to the former rectory is timber framed with rendered infill, on a magnesian limestone plinth, with a pantile roof, the lower three courses in stone slate. There are three surviving bays, and two storeys, the upper storey jettied with carved dragon posts and grotesques. The timber framing is close studded, and in the ground floor is a basket-arched opening with a surround of hollow chamfering and carved spandrels. The windows are 20th-century replacements.	II*
Sundial; 53.86486°N 1.19292°W		16th century	The sundial is in the churchyard of All Saints' Church to the south of the church. It is in magnesian limestone, and about 3 metres (9.8 ft) high. The sundial consists of a square stepped plinth, and a Doric column carrying a four-faced dial with an obelisk and a ball finial.	II
The Old Rectory; 53.86519°N 1.19348°W		1698	The house is in magnesian limestone with fronting in reddish-brown brick, largely pebbledashed and colourwashed, on a plinth, with stone dressings, quoins, a floor band, and a Welsh slate roof with stone coping and shaped kneelers. There are two storeys and attics, and eight bays. The doorway has an architrave, a fanlight, a keystone, and a moulded cornice, above which is a sundial. The doorway is flanked by casement windows, in the outer bays are canted bay windows, the upper floor contains sash windows, and there are two raking dormers.	II
Hornington Manor; 53.86927°N 1.21720°W	—	Early to mid 18th century	A farmhouse in pinkish-brown brick, with red brick dressings, quoins, a floor band, raised and stepped eaves, and a pantile roof with stone coping and a kneeler. There are two storeys, a main block with three bays, and flanking ranges, that on the left with three bays. In the centre is a doorway with pilasters, a fanlight, and a hood on brackets under a relieving segmental arch, flanked by canted bay windows. In the upper floor are sash windows with red brick quoined jambs and under quoined segmental arches.	II
Old Rectory Cottage; 53.86535°N 1.19266°W	—	Early to mid 18th century (probable)	The house is in magnesian limestone and pinkish-orange brick, with a floor band, and a tile roof hipped on the left. There are two storeys and three bays. The windows are casements, and the ground floor openings have flat brick arches.	II
The Crown Inn; 53.86459°N 1.19339°W		Mid 18th century	A house, later an inn, in pinkish-brown brick and some magnesian limestone at the rear, with a pantile roof including a lower course of stone slate. There are two storeys and four bays, a rear outshut, and a single-storey extension to the left. On the front are two doorways, each with a fanlight, and the windows are sashes, one horizontally-sliding. The ground floor openings have segmental arches, and the upper floor windows have elliptical arches.	II
Priest Hill Cottage; 53.86439°N 1.19237°W		Late 18th century	A house and smithy in pinkish-brown brick, with an eaves band and a pantile roof with the remains of gable coping. There are two storeys and three bays, and a single-storey extension to the left. The windows are sashes, the ground floor openings have blocked segmental arches, and the upper floor windows have blocked elliptical arches.	II
Bolton Lodge; 53.86007°N 1.20302°W	—	Early 19th century	A house, later divided into two, in red brick and magnesian limestone, rendered on the front, with a hipped Welsh slate roof. There are two storeys and a U-shaped plan, consisting of a main range of six bays, the third bay bowed, and a single-storey single-bay left wing. Steps lead up to a doorway in the bowed bay, with a fanlight and radial glazing. The windows are sashes, and on the right return is a bay window.	II
North House; 53.86656°N 1.19283°W		1832	A house later used for other purposes, it is in Tadcaster limestone, with overhanging eaves, and a pantile roof, the gables with decorative bargeboards. There is a single storey and an attic, and an L-shaped plan, consisting of a range with two bays and a projecting gabled right wing. The doorway has an elliptical head, a chamfered architrave, and decorative spandrels. To its left is a three-light window with chamfered mullions, and on the gable end is a canted bay window.	II
