= Haltemprice (constituency) =

Parliamentary constituency in the United Kingdom, 1950–1983

Coordinates: 53.751°N 0.428°W

- Former county constituency for the House of Commons

1955–1983
- Seats: one
- Replaced by: Beverley and Boothferry

Kingston upon Hull, Haltemprice
- Former borough constituency for the House of Commons

1950–1955
- Seats: one
- Created from: Holderness and Howdenshire

Haltemprice (which from 1950 to 1955 was officially known as Kingston upon Hull, Haltemprice) was a constituency in the East Riding of Yorkshire, a traditional sub-division of the historic county of Yorkshire. It returned one Member of Parliament (MP) to the House of Commons of the Parliament of the United Kingdom. It was created for the 1950 general election, and abolished for the 1983 general election.

== Boundaries ==
1950–1955: The Urban District of Haltemprice, and the County Borough of Kingston-upon-Hull wards of Pickering and St Andrew's.

1955–1983: The Municipal Borough of Beverley, the Urban District of Haltemprice, and the Rural District of Beverley. The two Kingston-upon-Hull wards were transferred to the Hull West constituency.

In the 1983 redistribution, which reflected the major local government boundary changes of 1974, this constituency disappeared. Most of it became the new seat of Beverley, while the remainder of the constituency contributed 11.6% of the new Boothferry seat.

== Members of Parliament ==
Election	Member	Party	Notes
1950	Richard Law	Conservative	Resigned 1954 on being raised to the peerage
1954 by-election	Patrick Wall	Conservative	
1983	constituency abolished		

== Election results ==
=== Elections in the 1950s ===
General election 1950: Kingston-upon-Hull Haltemprice
Party	Candidate	Votes	%	±%
Conservative	Richard Law	23,482	49.6	
Labour	T. L. Addy Taylor	18,156	38.3	
Liberal	Albert Burrell	5,723	12.1	
Majority		5,326	11.3	
Turnout		47,361	85.1	
Conservative win (new seat)				

General election 1951: Kingston-upon-Hull Haltemprice
Party	Candidate	Votes	%	±%
Conservative	Richard Law	27,167	58.1	+8.5
Labour	Charles W. Bridges	19,584	41.9	+3.6
Majority		7,583	16.2	+4.9
Turnout		46,751	82.8	−2.3
Conservative hold		Swing		

1954 Haltemprice by-election
Party	Candidate	Votes	%	±%
Conservative	Patrick Wall	16,107	61.8	+3.7
Labour	Charles W. Bridges	9,974	38.2	−3.7
Majority		6,133	23.6	+7.4
Turnout		26,081		
Conservative hold		Swing		

General election 1955: Haltemprice
Party	Candidate	Votes	%	±%
Conservative	Patrick Wall	26,162	68.9	+11.8
Labour	Harry Roberts	11,820	31.1	−11.8
Majority		14,342	37.8	+21.6
Turnout		37,982	74.8	−8.0
Conservative hold		Swing		

General election 1959: Haltemprice
Party	Candidate	Votes	%	±%
Conservative	Patrick Wall	26,102	60.1	−8.8
Labour	David Nicholson Bancroft	9,750	22.5	−8.6
Liberal	W. Ivor Cooper	7,562	17.4	New
Majority		16,352	37.6	−0.2
Turnout		43,414	80.5	+5.7
Conservative hold		Swing		

=== Elections in the 1960s ===
General election 1964: Haltemprice
Party	Candidate	Votes	%	±%
Conservative	Patrick Wall	26,131	56.2	−3.9
Labour	Peter Allison	10,360	22.3	−0.2
Liberal	Sydney Burnley	9,986	21.5	+4.1
Majority		15,771	33.9	−3.7
Turnout		46,477	79.5	−1.0
Conservative hold		Swing		

General election 1966: Haltemprice
Party	Candidate	Votes	%	±%
Conservative	Patrick Wall	25,566	54.6	−1.6
Labour	Phyllis Clarke	13,017	27.8	+5.5
Liberal	Sydney Burnley	8,277	17.7	−3.8
Majority		12,549	26.8	−7.1
Turnout		46,860	76.5	−3.0
Conservative hold		Swing		

=== Elections in the 1970s ===
General election 1970: Haltemprice
Party	Candidate	Votes	%	±%
Conservative	Patrick Wall	30,042	53.6	−1.0
Labour	Christopher M. Denton	15,862	28.3	+0.5
Liberal	Stuart C. Haywood	10,129	18.0	+0.3
Majority		14,180	25.3	−1.5
Turnout		56,033	74.8	−1.7
Conservative hold		Swing		

General election February 1974: Haltemprice
Party	Candidate	Votes	%	±%
Conservative	Patrick Wall	31,720	50.6	−3.0
Liberal	Robert Walker	19,896	31.8	+13.8
Labour	Laurie Cross	11,031	17.6	−10.7
Majority		11,824	18.9	−6.4
Turnout		62,647	82.9	+8.1
Conservative hold		Swing		

General election October 1974: Haltemprice
Party	Candidate	Votes	%	±%
Conservative	Patrick Wall	28,206	49.3	−1.3
Liberal	Robert Walker	16,566	29.0	−2.8
Labour	Laurie Cross	12,383	21.7	+4.1
Majority		11,640	20.3	+1.4
Turnout		57,155	74.9	−8.0
Conservative hold		Swing		

General election 1979: Haltemprice
Party	Candidate	Votes	%	±%
Conservative	Patrick Wall	34,525	55.8	+6.5
Liberal	Robert Walker	14,637	23.6	−5.4
Labour	H.J. Elcock	12,743	20.6	−1.1
Majority		19,888	32.2	+11.9
Turnout		61,509	77.3	+2.4
Conservative hold		Swing		

== In popular culture ==
Following its abolition, Haltemprice was depicted in the Yorkshire Television series The New Statesman as the constituency of the fictional ultra-right Conservative MP Alan B'Stard, who won it at the 1987 election after cutting the break lines of his Labour and Alliance opponents' cars. The election and its aftermath are the primary concern of the series' first episode, Happiness is a Warm Gun, and depicts Screaming Lord Sutch of the Monster Raving Loony Party finishing second behind B'Stard, winning more votes than the hospitalised Labour or the Alliance candidates combined.

1987 general election: Haltemprice
Party	Candidate	Votes	%	±%
Conservative	Alan Beresford B'Stard	31,756	76.9	
Monster Raving Loony	Screaming Lord Sutch	5,019	12.2	
Labour	William Richard Hanslon	3,237	7.8	
SDP (Alliance)	Martin Cyril Roeper	1,265	3.1	
Majority		26,737	64.7	
Turnout		41,277		
Conservative hold		Swing		

== Sources ==
- Boundaries of Parliamentary Constituencies 1885-1972, compiled and edited by F.W.S. Craig (Parliamentary Reference Publications 1972)
- British Parliamentary Constituencies: A Statistical Compendium, by Ivor Crewe and Anthony Fox (Faber and Faber 1984)
- British Parliamentary Election Results 1950-1973, compiled and edited by F.W.S. Craig (Parliamentary Research Services 1983)
- Who's Who of British Members of Parliament, Volume IV 1945-1979, edited by M. Stenton and S. Lees (Harvester Press 1981)
- Leigh Rayment's Historical List of MPs – Constituencies beginning with "H" (part 1)
