= Bolton Percy =

Village and civil parish in North Yorkshire, England

Coordinates: 53°51′50″N 1°11′27″W

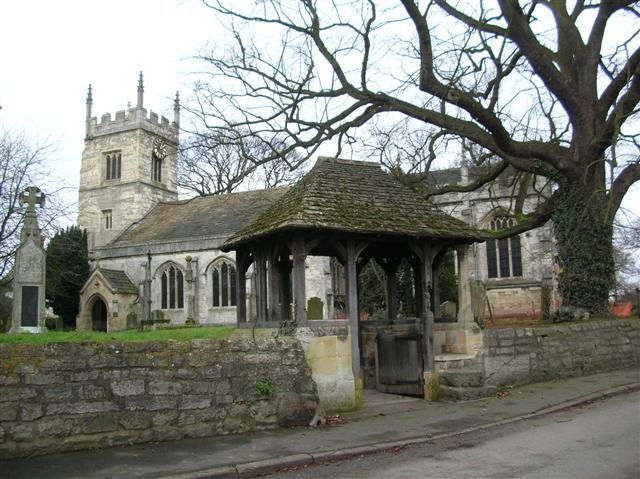
- All Saints Church, Bolton Percy, dates from 1424

- Location within North Yorkshire
- Population: 304 (2011 Census)
- OS grid reference: SE533413
  - London: 210 mi (340 km) SSE
- Civil parish: Bolton Percy
- Unitary authority: North Yorkshire
- Ceremonial county: North Yorkshire
- Region: Yorkshire and the Humber
- Country: England
- Sovereign state: United Kingdom
- Post town: YORK
- Postcode district: YO23
- Dialling code: 01904
- Police: North Yorkshire
- Fire: North Yorkshire
- Ambulance: Yorkshire
- UK Parliament: Wetherby and Easingwold

Bolton Percy is a village and civil parish in the county of North Yorkshire, England. According to the 2001 census it had a population of 305 in 115 households, reducing marginally to 304 at the 2011 census. The village is about 4 miles (6 km) east of Tadcaster.

The village was historically part of the West Riding of Yorkshire until 1974. From 1974 to 2023 it was part of the Selby District, it is now administered by the unitary North Yorkshire Council.

== History ==
The Bolton Percy hoard, dating to the ninth century is from the parish. Parcels of coins from it were discovered on two occasions, firstly in 1846 and then in 1967. The coins in the assemblage are Northumbrian pennies, known as 'stycas'.

Following the Norman Conquest, when William de Malet served as the county's first High Sheriff, the village of Bolton Percy was held by Malet himself. Later the lordship of the manor fell to the Percy family, as noted by Kirkby's Inquest of 1284. It was at this time that the name of Percy was added to the village's name.

The lordship of the manor passed to the Vesci family, who lived in the south of the county, near Roche Abbey. In 1290 John, Lord Vesci, contributed towards the marriage of King Edward I's eldest daughter, as was mandated by Lord Vesci's holding of knights fees on his manor of Bolton Percy. The lordship of Bolton Percy next passed to their relatives the Beaumonts on the death of the de Vesci heir. Later the lordship of Bolton Percy passed to the Fairfax family, who were associated with the village for several centuries and whose family memorials can be found in the village church.

The Old Rectory is a Grade II listed William and Mary house dating from 1698. It was formerly the residence of the Archdeacon of York and more recently the Bishop of Selby; it is now a private residence. Bolton Percy Gatehouse, formerly the entrance range to the rectory, is a Grade II* listed building.

The village used to have a station on the Dearne Valley Line running from York to Sheffield via Pontefract Baghill and Moorthorpe. The station was closed in 1965.

== Geography ==
The village lies on the road between Appleton Roebuck and Tadcaster to the west of the main East Coast railway line and east of the Trans Pennine railway line. The soil is strong loam over clay.

== Governance ==
The village lies within the Wetherby and Easingwold Parliamentary constituency. It is also within the Appleton Roebuck and Church Fenton Ward of North Yorkshire Council.

The Parish Council covers the nearby village of Colton and Steeton. It has six members, three of whom are from Bolton Percy.

== Amenities ==
The village has a village hall and a public house. The village is served by one bus route from York to Colton. The village has a cricket club, which plays in the York & District Senior Cricket league.

== Religion ==
All Saints' Church, Bolton Percy, the parish church, was built in the 15th century by Thomas Parker.

== See also ==
- Listed buildings in Bolton Percy
