= Patrick Wall =

British commando and politician

Sir Patrick Wall MC VRD

Member of Parliament for Beverley (Haltemprice 1954–1983)
- In office 11 February 1954 – 18 May 1987
- Preceded by: Richard Law
- Succeeded by: James Cran

Personal details
- Born: 14 October 1916
- Died: 15 May 1998 (aged 81) Chichester, West Sussex, England
- Party: Conservative
- Spouse: Sheila Putnam (m. 1953; died 1983)

Military service
- Allegiance: United Kingdom
- Branch/service: Royal Marines
- Years of service: 1935–1957
- Rank: Major
- Commands: 47 Commando
- Battles/wars: Second World War
- Awards: Knight Bachelor; Military Cross; Volunteer Reserve Decoration; Legion of Merit (United States)

Sir Patrick Henry Bligh Wall, MC, VRD (14 October 1916 – 15 May 1998) was a British commando in the Royal Marines during the Second World War and later a Conservative Party politician. He was the Member of Parliament (MP) for Haltemprice in the East Riding of Yorkshire and subsequently for Beverley, over a period spanning 33 years. He was a leading figure in the Conservative Monday Club, and a parliamentary consultant to the Western Goals Institute. In the last decade of his life, he was President of the British UFO Research Association (BUFORA).

== Education and military career ==
The son of Henry Benedict Wall, Patrick Wall was educated at Downside School. He was commissioned into the Royal Marines in 1935 and qualified as a naval gunnery instructor. During the Second World War, he served onboard Iron Duke, Valiant, and Malaya, followed by a spell at HMS Turtle, the landing craft base. In 1945, he was patrol officer and second-in-command 48 Commando RM in the British Army on the Rhine, where he was wounded. Wall's exploits in action drew the highest commendation: "An outstanding character whose industry and devotion to duty are beyond praise. He is a very devout man, and draws real inspiration from his Roman Catholic religion. In battle and behind the line, he is an example of energy and the aggressive spirit. His aim appears to be to do as much as possible", stated his report.

He was awarded the Military Cross in the North-West Europe campaign, and was awarded the US Legion of Merit the same year, for his services during the invasion operations in northern Italy and the south of France. He taught at the Royal Naval College, Greenwich in 1946, and the Joint Services Staff College from 1947 to 1948. He spent a further two years on the staff of the Commandant-General, RM. He was promoted to the rank of major in 1949, and decided to leave the Royal Marines the following year in order to enter politics.

He continued his naval connection as Commander of 47 Commando Royal Marines Voluntary Reserve from 1951 to 1957, and from 1950 to 1966, was Commissioner of the Sea Scouts for London.

In 1953, Wall married Sheila Elizabeth, daughter of James Putnam, of Broadstone, Dorset.

== Political career ==
Wall was a councillor on the City of Westminster Council from 1953 to 1963. In the 1951 General Election and a subsequent by-election in 1952, he stood unsuccessfully for the parliamentary seat of Cleveland, Yorkshire. He was later elected Conservative Party Member of Parliament for Haltemprice 1954–1983, and for Beverley, Yorkshire 1983–1987. He was Parliamentary Private Secretary to the Minister of Agriculture, Fisheries and Food 1955–57, and to the Chancellor of the Exchequer 1958–59. He was UK delegate to the United Nations General Assembly in 1962, Vice-Chairman of the Parliamentary Select Committee on Defence 1965–1977, Chairman of the British-South Africa Parliamentary Group 1970–1987, on the British-Portuguese Parliamentary Group 1979–1987, and leader of the British delegation to the North Atlantic Assembly 1979–1987, of which he was president, 1983–1985.

In February 1972, in the House of Commons he called for government intervention in the miners' strike, saying that "initimidation and even violence by picketing miners has given rise to widespread anxiety".

During the Thatcher years, Wall reflected that Britain had "moved rapidly to the Left under Labour governments, and more slowly to the Left under successive Conservative governments".

During this period, he sat on numerous parliamentary committees, one of which recommended building a strategic airfield in the Falkland Islands after the war.

Wall was knighted in the 1981 Birthday Honours

== Views on Africa and communism ==
Wall chaired several party committees concerned with Africa. He defended the British colonial record and was convinced of the benefits of white rule in Rhodesia and South Africa. In 1960, he claimed that the colonial problem arose not from differences in colour, but from differences in standards. "What we have to do is to work as hard as we can by raising the standards of the black Africans to ensure that we level up and do not take the easy way out by levelling down. Progress in Central Africa depends on the maintenance of standards and I believe we owe it, not only to our kith and kin, but to the vast mass of as yet uneducated black Africans for whom we are trustees, to see that the existing standards in Central Africa are not debased." (cf. Reeves, p. 116).

He was a friend of the Rhodesian Prime Minister, Ian Smith, and fully supported him. After Rhodesia's UDI in 1965, he joined forces with Robert Gascoyne-Cecil, 5th Marquess of Salisbury, to lead the Conservative revolt against their party's support for the Labour administration's sanctions policy.

Wall believed that white rule in Southern Africa was the last bulwark against the spread of communism in the region, which he described as "this evil virus". He argued that this, in turn, would mean that the West would lose vital mineral supplies and that the oil route round the Cape would come under threat.

In 1974, Wall criticised the Labour government's pull-out from the Simonstown naval base in South Africa, and stated in the House of Commons that "they" (the government) "must be insane. This is the only link NATO has with the Cape. British interests in Africa as a strategic part of the world should be maintained." In 1975, writing in the journal To The Point, Patrick Wall said "the basic philosophy of the Communist powers is to detach Southern Africa from the Western World."

A committed supporter of the North Atlantic Treaty Organization (NATO), he was leader of the British delegation to the North Atlantic Assembly from 1979 to 1987. Wall was especially suspicious of the Foreign Office, which he believed had contributed to Britain's decline. He would quote an African minister's remark: "We never trust you British because you never protect your own tribe."

== Monday Club ==
Wall was an early member (1963) of the Conservative Monday Club, sat on several of its committees, served on its Executive Council, and was National Club Chairman 1978–80. He collaborated on many papers and publications for the club, and spoke for club policies and concerns in the House of Commons.

On May Day 1970, the club held a 'Law and Liberty' rally in Trafalgar Square where he, and several other of the club's MPs were principal speakers. In November 1971, he and John Biggs-Davison, joined, as observers, British troops in action in Northern Ireland against the Irish Republican Army (IRA).

As University Groups Parliamentary Liaison Officer, he was active in supporting the 55 Monday Club groups formed in universities and colleges. He became a target for the Left and was denounced by the National Union of Students. In 1968, he was attacked at Leeds University and his wife was knocked to the ground and kicked. Speaking at Portsmouth Polytechnic in December 1972, his meeting was broken up by a shouting group of students who pelted Wall with missiles.

In May 1974, Wall, John Biggs-Davison, and Robert Taylor tabled a motion in the House of Commons deploring the Labour government's decision to cancel the visit of the Royal Yacht Britannia to Cape Town, describing it as "vindictive and selective spite." In August 1974, Commander Anthony Courtney and Wall issued a Monday Club Paper criticising the "high proportion of official Communist representatives in London, who are known to be engaged in 'legal' espionage under diplomatic cover." They warned also that Britain would become increasingly vulnerable following the opening of a Soviet Embassy in Dublin as the IRA was Marxist.

In a letter published in the Daily Telegraph in November 1974, Patrick Wall wrote "Conservatism has lost millions of votes because the man in the street no longer believes that they stand primarily for Britain's interests." He added: "to the man in the street the Conservative leadership has been more intent on crushing the Rhodesians than the IRA; more interested in the Ugandan Asians than in maintaining the rights of Britons living abroad; more worried about Enoch Powell than Messrs. Hugh Scanlon and Arthur Scargill".

Wall was presented with a Fellowship Certificate of the Chartered Institute of Journalists at a formal reception for the occasion, held at the National Liberal Club, London, on Wednesday 12 July 1989.

== Connection to offshore and citizens' band (CB) radio ==
Wall was one of a number of Conservative MPs associated with Radio 270, an offshore radio station broadcasting off the Yorkshire coast in the 1960s. On 11 May 1967 the station gave Conservative candidates in local elections at Scarborough airtime which the candidates had paid for themselves, and on 14 May it broadcast a programme made by the York University branch of the Monday Club, in which Wall spoke on Rhodesia. Labour MP Andrew Faulds called (perhaps not entirely seriously) for the results of some municipal elections to be declared invalid because an "illegal broadcast" had been made, and Postmaster-General Edward Short stated that "It is the first time in peacetime that this country has been subjected to a stream of misleading propaganda from outside our territorial waters and I do not think this is a matter for joking". (ref. The Times, 12 and 15 May 1967)

Shortly before the Marine Broadcasting Offences Act 1967 became law later that year, Radio 270 carried a broadcast, also sponsored by the University of York Monday Club, attacking the government for closing down the pirate stations. Wall, Ronald Bell and John Biggs-Davison, all prominent members of the Monday Club, took part. John Biggs-Davison stated that he felt that many Labour supporters would also regret the Act, claiming that "concern for freedom is not confined to one party and a voice of freedom will have been silenced when Radio 270 goes off the air". Wall said that "I think it is monstrous that private enterprise radio stations are being closed, and even more monstrous that the Government are not setting up an adequate alternative to cater for the amusement that many people want to hear. Indeed, I have had more letters on this subject than on any other in the 13 years I have been MP for Haltemprice". (ref. The Times, 11 August 1967)

Eventually, the Conservative party would bring about deregulation of the media (through the Broadcasting Act 1990) such as was being called for.

From 1976 until its success in 1981, Wall was also a strong supporter of the campaign for the legalisation of Citizens' Band Radio in the UK, and was one of the most influential members of the House of Commons ad hoc committee on CB.

== Publications ==
- Wall, Patrick, Soviet Maritime Thrust Monday Club, London (P/B).
- Wall, Patrick, Southern Ocean and the Security of the Free World.
- Wall, Patrick, M. C., V. R. D., M. P., with John P. P. Smith, Student Power Monday Club, London, 1968, (P/B).
- Wall, Patrick, M. C., M. P., with John Biggs-Davison, M. P., Julian Amery, M. P., Stephen Hastings, M. C., M. P., Harold Soref, M. P., Rhodesia and the Threat to the West, Monday Club, London, 1976, (P/B).
- Wall, Patrick, The Royal Marine Pocket Book, with Lt G A M Ritson RM

== Archives ==
- Wall, Sir Patrick: Papers held at the Hull History Centre Archives.

Parliament of the United Kingdom
Preceded by Richard Law	Member of Parliament for Haltemprice; 1954–1983	Constituency abolished
New constituency	Member of Parliament for Beverley; 1983–1987	Succeeded by James Cran
Party political offices
Preceded by Sir Victor Raikes	Chairman of the Monday Club; May 1978 – April 1980	Succeeded by Cllr. Sam Swerling
