= John Arnott (politician) =

Scottish politician

John Arnott (1871 – 20 February 1942) was a British politician.

Born in Kincardine-on-Forth, Arnott worked as a blacksmith. He became involved in the trade union movement studied at Ruskin College. He also became active in the Independent Labour Party and was elected to Leeds City Council. He led the Labour group on the council from 1917 to 1920, and again from 1922 until 1925.

The ILP was affiliated to the Labour Party, and at the 1918 general election, Arnott stood for it in Leeds West, but was not elected. He then stood in Kingston upon Hull South West repeatedly, losing in 1922, 1923 and 1924. In 1925, he was chosen as Lord Mayor of Leeds. He finally won the Hull South West seat at the 1929 general election, and although his candidacy was sponsored by the ILP, he was no longer playing any part in the party, leading him to leave it when it disaffiliated from the Labour Party.

Arnott lost his seat at the 1931 general election, and failed to win it back in 1935.

Civic offices
Preceded by Charles Granville Gibson	Lord Mayor of Leeds; 1925–1926	Succeeded by Hugh Lupton
Parliament of the United Kingdom
Preceded by Herbert Brent Grotrian	Member of Parliament for Kingston upon Hull South West; 1929–1931	Succeeded by Richard Law
