= 1954 Haltemprice by-election =

UK Parliamentary by-election

The 1954 Haltemprice by-election was held on 11 February 1954. It was held due to the elevation to a hereditary peerage of the incumbent Conservative MP, Richard Kidston Law. The by-election was won by the Conservative candidate, Patrick Wall.

Haltemprice by-election, 1954
Party	Candidate	Votes	%	±%
Conservative	Patrick Wall	16,107	61.8	+3.7
Labour	Charles W. Bridges	9,974	38.2	−3.7
Majority		6,133	23.6	+7.4
Turnout		26,081		
Conservative hold		Swing		
