= United University Club =

London gentlemen's club

Coordinates: 51°30′29.34″N 0°7′49.64″W

The United University Club was a London gentlemen's club, founded in 1821. It occupied the purpose-built University Club House, at 1, Suffolk Street, London, England, from 1826 until 1971.

== Formation and membership ==
The club was founded at a meeting held at the Thatched House Tavern on 30 June 1821 and held its first Annual General Meeting at Willis's Rooms on 27 April 1822, under the chairmanship of Prince William Frederick, Duke of Gloucester and Edinburgh.

It was agreed that the club would admit no more than one thousand members and former members of the Universities of Oxford and Cambridge, five hundred from each. This limitation remained in place for more than one hundred years. As a result, only eight years after the club's foundation, its waiting list was so long that a second club was formed, called the Oxford and Cambridge Club.

The initial entrance-fee was set at twenty-five guineas and the annual subscription at six guineas. By 1879, these figures had increased to thirty guineas and eight guineas. It was reported in Dickens's Dictionary of London (1879) that "The members elect by ballot, one black ball in ten excludes".

== Premises ==
The club's premises, called the University Club House, were at 1, Suffolk Street, London near Trafalgar Square. They were designed by the architect William Wilkins RA and by his colleague J. P. Gandy and opened on 13 February 1826. Wilkins was also the architect of the nearby National Gallery in Trafalgar Square, finished in 1838, and of the main buildings of Downing College, Cambridge.

The club was re-built on a grander scale in 1906, with Reginald Blomfield as architect. In 1906, friezes by Henry Alfred Pegram RA (1862–1937) were also commissioned. An extension was added on the north side of the building in 1924 (again designed by Blomfield) and another extension on the east side in 1939–40.

Sir Nikolaus Pevsner described the development as "Sir Reginald Blomfield’s essay in Champs Elysées style".

== Merger with New University Club ==
A third club for members of the two Universities, founded in 1864 and called the New University Club, had its rooms at 57 St James's Street. This amalgamated with the United University Club in 1938.

== Merger with Oxford and Cambridge Club ==
After the Second World War, the gentlemen's clubs of London fell into a decline, and in 1971 the United University Club closed its premises. In March 1972, it was merged with the Oxford and Cambridge Club. The combined club was initially called the 'United Oxford and Cambridge University Club' and in 1972–73 was housed at the University Club House, but thereafter it occupied the club house further down Pall Mall designed for the Oxford and Cambridge Club in 1836. The lease of the University Club House was surrendered to the ground landlord, the Crown Estate. The merged University club reverted to the name "Oxford and Cambridge Club" in 2001.

== Uses of the Club House since 1973 ==
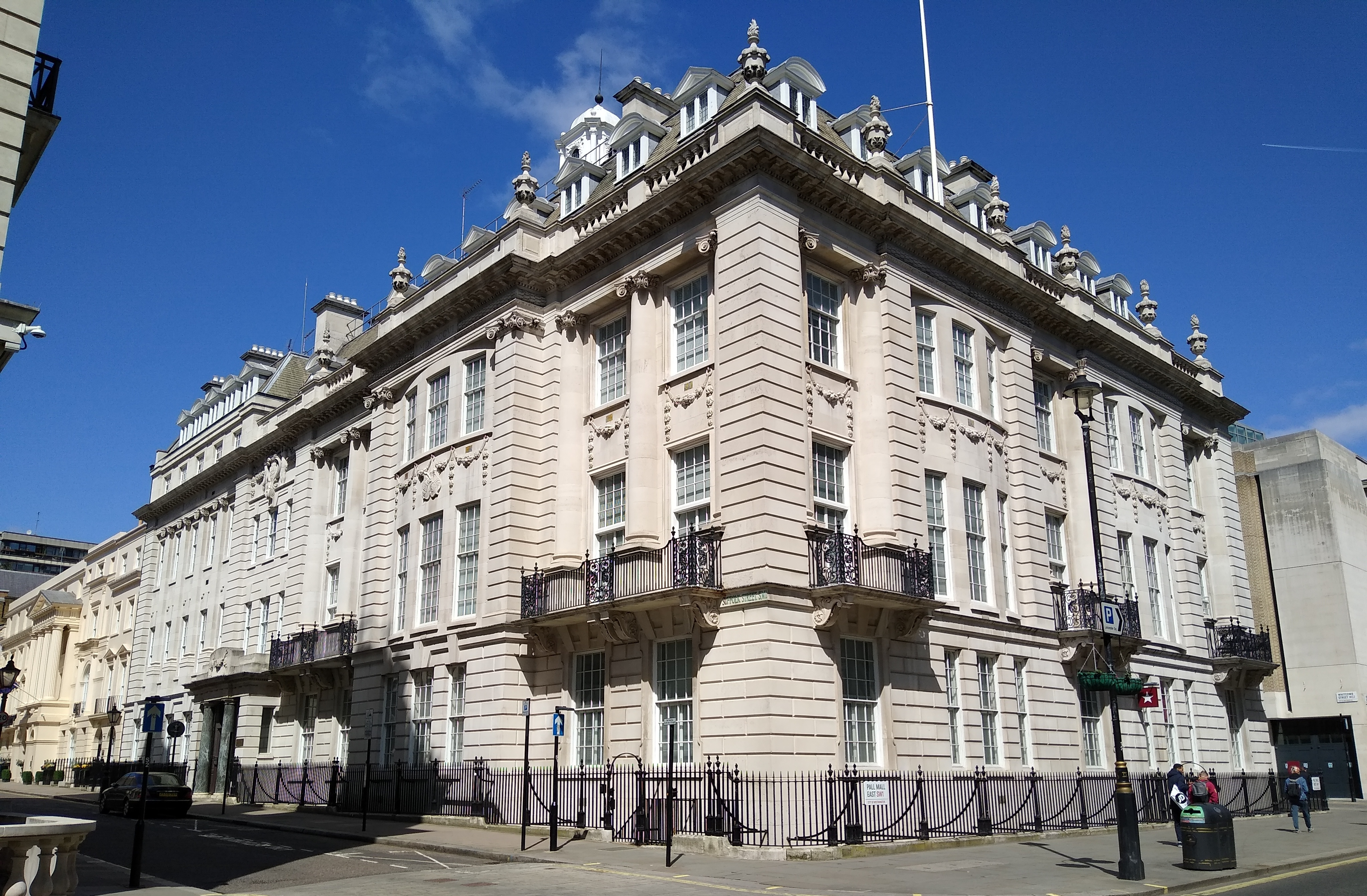
The former United University Club, pictured in 2021 as the University of Notre Dame's London centre

Number One Suffolk Street was occupied from 1973 until 1980 by the bankers Coutts & Co., from 1980 to 1997 by the British School of Osteopathy, and since 1998 as the London Centre of the University of Notre Dame. The Centre enables the Colleges of Arts & Letters, Business Administration, Science, Engineering and the Law School to develop their own programs in London.

== Distinguished past members ==
- William Ewart Gladstone (1809–1898), prime minister
- Stanley Baldwin, 1st Earl Baldwin of Bewdley (1867–1947), prime minister
- John Maynard Keynes, 1st Baron Keynes (1883–1946), economist
- Arthur Peel, 1st Viscount Peel (1829–1912), Speaker of the House of Commons 1884–1895
- Frederic Thesiger, 1st Viscount Chelmsford (1868–1933), Viceroy of India 1916–1921
- John George Dodson, 1st Baron Monk Bretton (1825–1897), politician
- Alexander Staveley Hill KC MP (1825–1905), barrister and politician
- Douglas Freshfield (1845–1934), mountaineer
- Sir Owen Seaman (1861–1936), editor of Punch 1906–1932
- Herbert Trench (1865–1923), poet
- Sir Leslie Scott KC MP (1869–1950), barrister and politician
- Sir Herbert Brent Grotrian, 1st Baronet (1870–1951), barrister and politician
- Geoffrey Winthrop Young (1879–1958), mountaineer and poet
- Percy Herbert, Bishop of Norwich (1885–1968)
- Sir Ivor Jennings (1903–1965), Vice-Chancellor of the University of Cambridge
- J. C. C. Davidson, 1st Viscount Davidson (1889–1970), politician

== See also ==
- List of London's gentlemen's clubs
