= James Cran =

British politician (1944–2023)

Member of Parliament for Beverley and Holderness Beverley (1987–1997)
- In office 11 June 1987 – 11 April 2005
- Preceded by: Patrick Wall
- Succeeded by: Graham Stuart

Personal details
- Born: James Douglas Cran; 28 January 1944 Aberdeenshire, Scotland
- Died: c. 1 June 2023 (aged 79) Ashkirk, Scotland
- Party: Conservative
- Spouse: Penelope Barbara Wilson
- Education: University of Aberdeen
- Occupation: Politician

James Douglas Cran (28 January 1944 – c. 1 June 2023) was a British Conservative Party politician. He was the Member of Parliament (MP) for Beverley (1987–1997) and for Beverley and Holderness (1997–2005).

== Early life ==
Cran went to Ruthrieston School in Aberdeen and became the school's 1959 Dux Medallion winner. He studied at the University of Aberdeen, gaining an Honours MA. He was the National Winner of the 1968 Daily Mirror Speaking Trophy.

Cran was a researcher in the Conservative Research Department during 1970–71 and was a member of then-Leader of the Opposition Ted Heath's briefing team during the 1970 general election. From 1971 to 1979, Cran was the Secretary and Chief Executive of the National Association of Pension Funds. He was the Northern Director for the Confederation of British Industry (CBI) from 1979 to 1984 and was the CBI's West Midlands Director from 1984 to 1987. From 1974 to 1979, he was a councillor in the London Borough of Sutton, and served as Chairman of the Health and Housing Committee.

== Parliamentary career ==
Cran became MP for Beverley in 1987 taking over from Sir Patrick Wall. In 1997 this constituency was abolished and Cran was elected to the successor constituency of Beverley and Holderness.

Cran was a member of the '92 Group of right-wing Conservative MPs and took an active part in the leadership contests involving John Major (June 1995), Michael Howard (1997) and the latter stages of William Hague's campaign (1997). Cran was a consistent opponent of the Maastricht Treaty, and of the single currency and closer European integration.

Cran was Parliamentary Private Secretary to Secretary of State for Northern Ireland Patrick Mayhew from 1995 to 1996. He was present with the Secretary of State in Washington DC at the first meeting with Gerry Adams, then President of Sinn Féin. Cran was also Pairing Whip and then Assistant Chief Whip (1997–2001). He was appointed Shadow Deputy Leader of the House of Commons by then-Leader of the Opposition Iain Duncan Smith but resigned shortly thereafter to pursue other activities. He was a member of a number of Select Committees: Trade and Industry (1987–92); Administration (1997–98); Selection (1998–2001); and Defence (2001–05). He was also a member of the Chairman of Ways and Means Panel (2001–05) and a member of the Council of Europe and the WEU (2001–02).

Other Parliamentary activities included:

- Vice Chairman, Conservative Backbench Northern Ireland Committee (1992–95)
- Order of St John All Party Group (1994–95)
- Secretary, Conservative Backbench Committee on Constitutional Affairs (1989–91)
- European Affairs (1989–91)
- All Party Anglo-Malta Group (1992–94) Co-founder
- Parliamentary Group on Occupational Pensions (1992)
- Member, Northern Ireland Grand Committee (1996–2001)
- Treasurer, European Research Group (1994–97)
- Member, '92 Group Steering Committee (2001–04)
- Council Member, Pension Trustees Forum (1992–95)
- Parliamentary Consultant, Lincoln National (UK) Plc (1994–98).

== Personal life and death ==
Cran married Penelope Barbara Wilson of South Kensington in 1973 and they had one daughter, Alexandra. Penelope died in 2014. Cran's dead body was discovered at his home in the village of Ashkirk on 1 June 2023. He was 79.

Following his death, James Cran's daughter, Dr Alexandra Walker, alleged sustained emotional (and occasionally physical) abuse at his hands, beginning in her childhood and carrying on up until she broke off contact with him shortly before he died. Dr Walker described Cran as "terrifying", a "Jekyll and Hyde character" prone to mood swings and sudden fits of rage exacerbated by alcohol. She recounted that he once locked her in a car for "what felt like hours" for accidentally hitting him with a skimming stone, and tied her arms down at a restaurant as a toddler for throwing a salt shaker, among various other incidents. Walker also felt that Cran consistently belittled her as an adult, and emotionally blackmailed her in the aftermath of her mother's death.

Some personal artefacts associated with Cran were listed for sale by auction on 13 February 2025 by Eastbourne Auctions.

Parliament of the United Kingdom
Preceded by Patrick Wall	Member of Parliament for Beverley; 1987–1997	Constituency abolished
New constituency	Member of Parliament for Beverley and Holderness; 1997–2005	Succeeded by Graham Stuart
