= Richard Law, 1st Baron Coleraine =

British Conservative politician (1901–1980)

The Right Honourable The Lord Coleraine PC
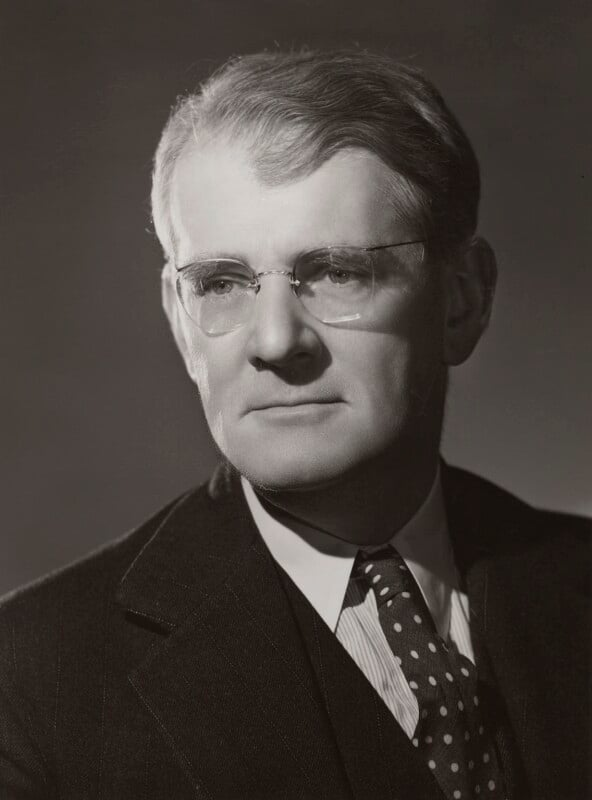
- Law in 1950

Minister of Education
- In office 24 May 1945 – 26 July 1945
- Prime Minister: Winston Churchill
- Preceded by: Rab Butler
- Succeeded by: Ellen Wilkinson

Member of Parliament for Haltemprice
- In office 23 February 1950 – 15 January 1954
- Preceded by: Constituency established
- Succeeded by: Patrick Wall

Member of Parliament for Kensington South
- In office 20 November 1945 – 3 February 1950
- Preceded by: William Davison
- Succeeded by: Patrick Spens

Member of Parliament for Kingston upon Hull South West
- In office 27 October 1931 – 15 June 1945
- Preceded by: John Arnott
- Succeeded by: Sydney Smith

Personal details
- Born: Richard Kidston Law; 27 February 1901
- Died: 15 November 1980 (aged 79)
- Party: Conservative
- Spouse: Mary Virginia Nellis (m. 1929; died 1978)
- Children: 2
- Parent(s): Bonar Law; Annie Robley Law
- Education: Shrewsbury School
- Alma mater: St John's College, Oxford
- Occupation: Politician

Richard Kidston Law, 1st Baron Coleraine (27 February 1901 – 15 November 1980), was a British Conservative politician.

== Early life ==
He was the youngest son among six children born to businessman and Conservative politician Bonar Law (who would go on to serve as Prime Minister of the United Kingdom from 1922 to 1923) and Law's wife, the former Annie Pitcairn Robley, a daughter of Harrington Robley, a merchant from Glasgow.

Richard's brother Charlie, a lieutenant in the King's Own Scottish Borderers, was killed at the Second Battle of Gaza in April 1917, followed by brother James, a captain in the Royal Fusiliers, who was shot down and killed on 21 September 1917. His sister Isabel married Sir Frederick Sykes, and another sister Catherine married The 1st Baron Archibald in 1961.

He was educated at Shrewsbury School and St John's College, Oxford.

== Political career ==
Law was elected as Member of Parliament (MP) for Kingston upon Hull South West in the general election of 1931 and held the seat until 1945. In 1940 he was appointed Financial Secretary to the War Office. He was then transferred to the post of Parliamentary Under-Secretary of State for Foreign Affairs until 1943. While in the latter post he took part in the Bermuda Conference on the fate of European Jewry and was sworn of the Privy Council in the 1943 New Year Honours.

He was then Minister of State, also at the Foreign Office, until 1945, when he served briefly as Minister of Education in the Churchill Caretaker ministry. In a by-election in November 1945 he became MP for Kensington South, which he held until February 1950.

Law moved seats and was again elected as an MP in the election of 1950, this time for Haltemprice, but he resigned this seat in January 1954 and in February was elevated to the House of Lords as Baron Coleraine of Haltemprice in the East Riding of the County of York. After his elevation to the peerage, he went on a two-week lecture tour in the United States, following two weeks in Russia at the invitation of the Russian government.

=== Published works ===
In 1950, Law published Return from Utopia, a book in which he stated his belief that trying to use the power of the state to create any sort of Utopia is not just unattainable but positively evil, because one of the first principles to be sacrificed is the principle of freedom and individual choice. Law argued:

To turn our backs on Utopia, to see it for the sham and the delusion that it is, is the beginning of hope. It is to hold out once again the prospect of a society in which man is free to be good because he is free to choose. Freedom is the first condition of human virtue and Utopia is incompatible with freedom. Come back from Utopia and hope is born again.

In 1970, Lord Coleraine published another book, For Conservatives Only, in which he criticised the Conservative leadership of the time for, in his view, sacrificing Tory principles for electoral expediency and the pursuit of the "middle ground". At this time he was Patron of the Selsdon Group of Conservative MPs.

== Personal life ==
On 26 January 1929, Lord Coleraine (when still Richard Law) married Mary Virginia Nellis, the second daughter of Abraham Fox Nellis, of Rochester, New York. Her father, a silk manufacturer, had died in 1923. Together, they were the parents of two children:

- James Law, 2nd Baron Coleraine (1931–2020), who married Emma Elizabeth Richards, only daughter of Nigel Richards, in 1958. After their divorce in 1966, he married Anne Patricia Farrant in 1966. She was the second daughter of Maj.-Gen. Ralph Henry Farrant.
- Hon. Andrew Bonar Law (b. 1933), who married Joanna Margarette Neill, daughter of Raymond Neill of Ireland, in 1961.

Lady Coleraine died on 3 April 1978 in Helensburgh, Scotland. Lord Coleraine died on 15 November 1980, age 79, and was succeeded in the barony by his son James Martin Bonar Law.

=== Descendants ===
Through his elder son James, he was a grandfather of Hon. Elizabeth Mary Law (b. 1961), who married Charles Ironside, 3rd Baron Ironside (only son and heir of Edmund Ironside, 2nd Baron Ironside) in 1985; Hon. Sophia Anne Law (b. 1964); Hon. James Peter Bonar Law (b. 1975), Hon. Henrietta Margaret Law (1968–1993), and Hon. Juliana Caroline Matilda Law (b. 1971). Through his son Andrew, he was a grandfather of Richard Pitcairn Bonar Law (b. 1963) and Charlotte Mary de Montmorency Law (b. 1964).

== Arms ==
Coat of arms of Richard Law, 1st Baron Coleraine
Crest Issuant from a chaplet of maple leaves Vert a demi salmon Proper. Escutcheon Argent a saltire Azure between four cocks Proper. Supporters Dexter a Basenji dog sinister a kid both Proper. Motto Thy Law My Thought

Parliament of the United Kingdom
Preceded by John Arnott	Member of Parliament for Kingston upon Hull South West; 1931–1945	Succeeded by Sydney Smith
Preceded by Sir William Davison	Member of Parliament for Kensington South; 1945–1950	Succeeded by Sir Patrick Spens
New constituency	Member of Parliament for Haltemprice; 1950–1954	Succeeded by Sir Patrick Wall
Political offices
Preceded by Edward Grigg	Financial Secretary to the War Office; 1940–1941	Succeeded by Duncan Sandys
Preceded by Rab Butler	Parliamentary Under-Secretary of State for Foreign Affairs; 1941–1943	Succeeded by George Hall
Preceded by Unknown	Minister of State for Foreign Affairs; 1943–1945	Succeeded by William Mabane
Preceded by Rab Butler	Minister of Education; 1945	Succeeded by Ellen Wilkinson
Peerage of the United Kingdom
New creation	Baron Coleraine; 1954–1980; Member of the House of Lords (1954–1980)	Succeeded by James Law
