= Cyril Entwistle =

British politician

Sir Cyril Entwistle MC, QC

Deputy Chairman of Ways and Means
- In office 26 February 1924 – 29 October 1924
- Speaker: John Henry Whitley
- Preceded by: Edwin Cornwall
- Succeeded by: Edward FitzRoy

Member of Parliament for Bolton
- In office 27 October 1931 – 26 July 1945
- Preceded by: Albert Law
- Succeeded by: John Lewis

Member of Parliament for Kingston upon Hull South West
- In office 14 December 1918 – 29 October 1924
- Preceded by: New constituency
- Succeeded by: Herbert Grotrian

Personal details
- Born: Cyril Fullard Entwistle; 23 September 1887 Bombay, Presidency of Bombay, British India
- Died: 9 July 1974 (aged 86)
- Party: Liberal (–1926); Conservative (1926–)
- Spouse: Ethel M. Towlson (m. 1940)
- Parent: Joe Entwistle (father)
- Education: Bolton Grammar School
- Alma mater: Victoria University of Manchester
- Occupation: Solicitor

Military service
- Branch/service: British Army
- Rank: Major
- Unit: Royal Garrison Artillery
- Awards: Military Cross

Major Sir Cyril Fullard Entwistle, MC, QC (23 September 1887 – 9 July 1974) was a Liberal Party politician in the United Kingdom. He later defected to the Conservative Party. He was a member of parliament (MP) from 1918 to 1924 and from 1931 to 1945.

== Early life and career ==
He was the son of Joe Entwistle of Bolton, Lancashire and St Anne's on Sea, a cotton manufacturer, and was born 23 September 1887 in Bombay. He was educated at Bolton Grammar School, and graduated LL.B. from Victoria University of Manchester in 1908. He took solicitors' examinations in 1909, and qualified as a solicitor in 1910.

In World War I, Entwistle commanded the 235th Siege Battery of the Royal Garrison Artillery. He was mentioned in dispatches and awarded the Military Cross.

== Political career ==
At the 1918 general election, Entwistle was elected as Liberal MP for Hull South West, and held the seat until he was defeated at the 1924 general election. He was an Asquithian Liberal, opposed to David Lloyd George; he defeated a Coalition Coupon-holding seaman's candidate (Coalition Labour). On the other hand, he has been counted as a coalition supporter.

Entwistle was called to the bar in 1919. He introduced in the House of Commons, as a private member's bill, the Matrimonial Causes Act 1923. The Act, to give women legal equality in divorce cases, in particular with respect to adultery, was pressed for by NUSEC and the Six Point Group. Lord Buckmaster, who had failed with a divorce reform bill in 1920, introduced Entwistle's bill in the House of Lords; the Act passed was aimed solely at removing the issue of a double standard.

Entwistle then devoted himself to the law and business. He left the rump Liberals under Lloyd George in early 1926, over land policy, with Alfred Mond, Henry Mond and J. Suenson-Taylor. After joining the Conservatives that year, he unsuccessfully contested Bolton at the 1929 general election. He won the seat as a Tory in 1931, and held it until his defeat in the Labour Party landslide at the 1945 election. He was chairman from 1929 of Ballington Hosiery Ltd., formed to merge Ballington Ltd. of Basinghall Street, London with The St. Albans Hosiery Mills.

In 1931 Entwistle took silk. He became Chairman of Decca Records in 1934. He was knighted in 1937, "for political and public services".

== Family ==
Entwistle married in 1940 Ethel M. Towlson of Hale, Cheshire.

Parliament of the United Kingdom
| New constituency | Member of Parliament for Hull South West; 1918–1924 | Succeeded by Herbert Grotrian |
| Preceded by Michael Brothers and Albert Law | Member of Parliament for Bolton; 1931–1945; With: Sir John Haslam, to 1940; Sir Edward Cadogan, from 1940 | Succeeded by John Lewis and Jack Jones |
