= All Saints' Church, Bolton Percy =

Historic church in Bolton Percy, North Yorkshire, England

Church of All Saints, Bolton Percy
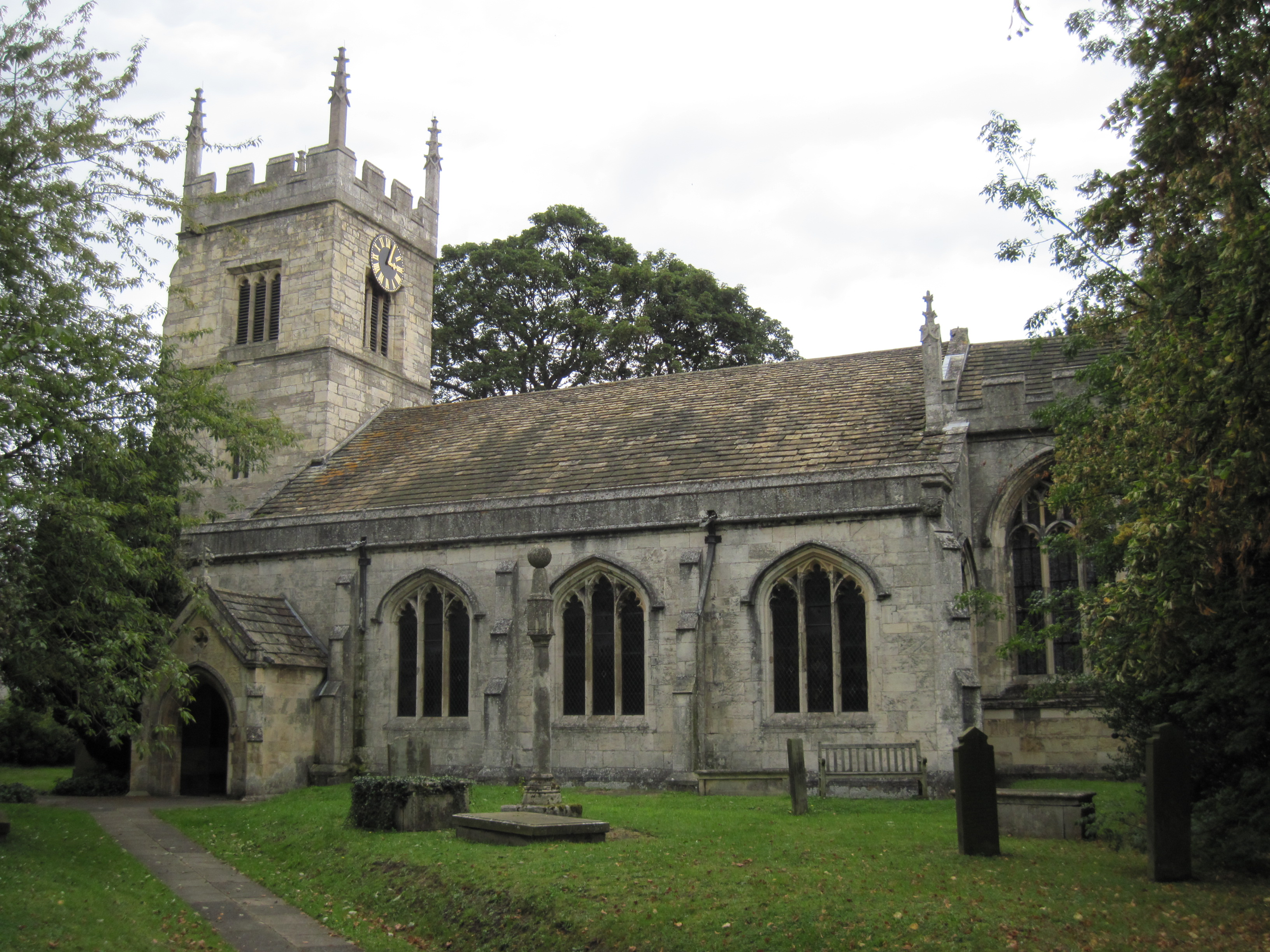
- Church of All Saints, Bolton Percy
- 53.8650°N 1.1930°W
- OS grid reference: SE 53175 41275
- Location: Bolton Percy, North Yorkshire
- Country: England
- Denomination: Church of England

History
- Status: Parish church
- Dedication: All Saints

Architecture
- Functional status: Active
- Heritage designation: Grade I listed
- Designated: 3 February 1967
- Style: Gothic

Specifications
- Materials: Limestone

Administration
- Diocese: York
- Archdeaconry: York
- Deanery: New Ainsty
- Parish: Bolton Percy

All Saints' Church is the parish church of Bolton Percy, in North Yorkshire in England.

There was a church in Bolton Percy at the time of the Domesday Book. The current church was built while Thomas Percy was rector, and it was consecrated on 8 July 1424 by Nicholas Warte, the Bishop of Dromore. The east window of the church was restored in 1866 by William Warrington, and the whole building was restored in 1890 by James Demaine and Walter Brierley, and in 1905 by John Bilson. The building was Grade I listed in 1967. It was again re-roofed in 2016, using a grant from the National Churches Trust. Given the size and quality of the building, it is locally nicknamed the "Cathedral of the Ainsty".

The church is built of Magnesian Limestone and is roofed with stone slates. There is a west tower, a four-bay nave with aisles and a south porch, and then a three-bay chancel with a vestry on the north side. The tower has three stages; in 1844, it was recorded as having a fourth stage of later date, which has since been removed. It is supported with buttresses and is now topped by battlements. Most of the windows have three lights and are Perpendicular in style, with the East window having five lights.

The church has 14 stained glass windows, the glass ranging in date from medieval to contemporary. The east window contains preserved fragments of 15th-century glass, reset in 1866 as part of a larger scheme commissioned from the London firm of William Warrington that provided with new glass for the six other windows in the chancel. In the north aisle are four 19th century windows, two by Burlison and Grylls and one by Charles Eamer Kempe. The fourth was designed by the Pre-Raphaelite artist Edward Burne-Jones and depicts Charity sheltering children. At the west end of the north aisle is a modern window by Thomas Denny, installed in 2000 to mark the Millennium. It takes as its theme the concept of time and eternity, incorporating references to Bolton Percy.

Inside, there is a pointed arch opening to the tower, and octagonal piers supporting the arcades. The font is Norman, with a Jacobean cover. There is a prayer desk of the same period, and a pulpit from the era of Charles II. There is also a sedilia with three gables, and a piscina with a carved angel at its base. There is a Mediaeval floor slab dedicated to Elizabeth Ryther, and several 17th-century memorials, including a Baroque wall monument dedicated to Ferdinando Fairfax, 2nd Lord Fairfax of Cameron. The interior has oak box pews which are also Jacobean.

== Gallery ==
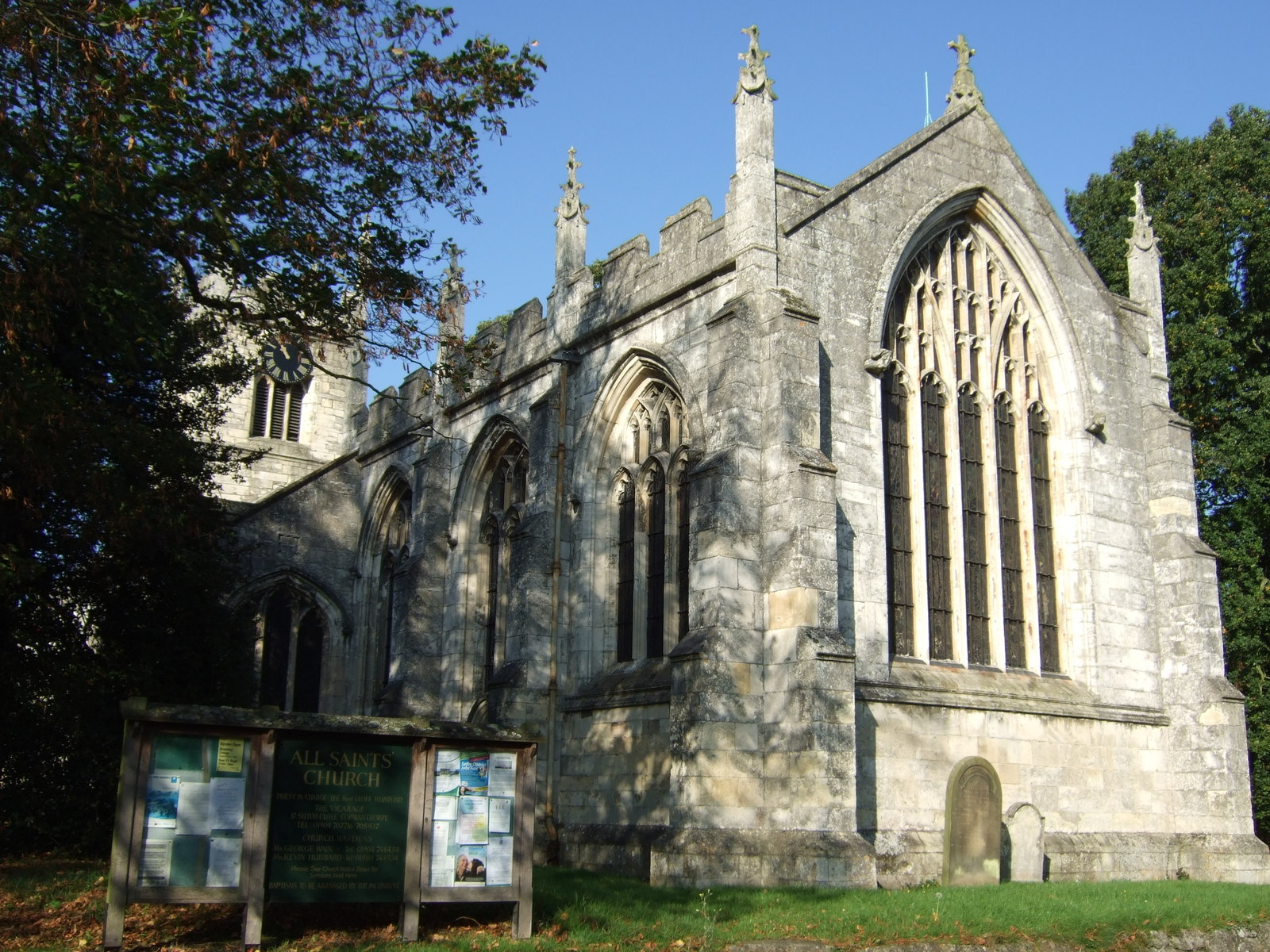
East end of the church, seen in 2011

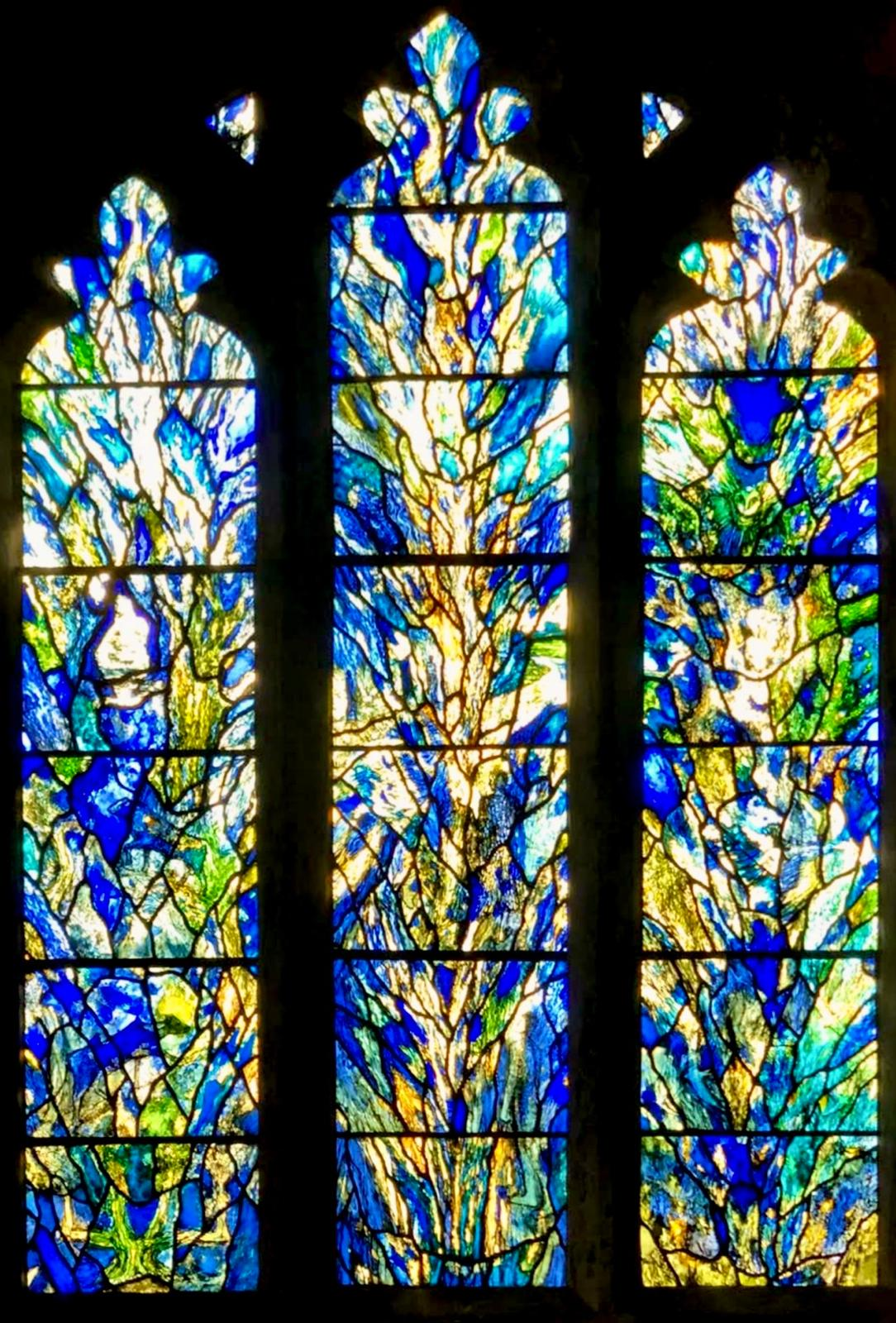
Millennium window by Thomas Denny (2000)

== See also ==
- Grade I listed buildings in North Yorkshire (district)
- Listed buildings in Bolton Percy
