= Grotrian baronets =

Baronetcy in the Baronetage of the United Kingdom

The Grotrian Baronetcy, of Leighton Buzzard in the County of Bedford, is a title in the Baronetage of the United Kingdom. It was created on 28 June 1934 for Herbert Brent Grotrian, who had earlier represented Kingston upon Hull South West in the House of Commons as a Conservative. He was the second son of Frederick Brent Grotrian, Conservative member of parliament for Kingston upon Hull East from 1886 to 1892.

== Grotrian baronets, of Leighton Buzzard (1934) ==
- Sir Herbert Brent Grotrian, 1st Baronet (1870–1951)
- Sir Joseph Appelbe Brent Grotrian, 2nd Baronet (1904–1984)
- Sir (Philip) Christian Brent Grotrian, 3rd Baronet (born 1935)

The heir apparent is the present holder's son Philip Timothy Adam Brent Grotrian (born 1962).

Coat of arms of Grotrian baronets
Crest A wyvern Or resting the dexter leg upon a rose Argent barbed and seeded Proper. Escutcheon Gules a wyvern Or in chief two roses Argent barbed and seeded Proper. Motto Animo Et Fide
