= Bolton Percy Gatehouse =

Gatehouse in Bolton Percy, North Yorkshire, England

Coordinates: 53°51′53″N 1°11′36″W

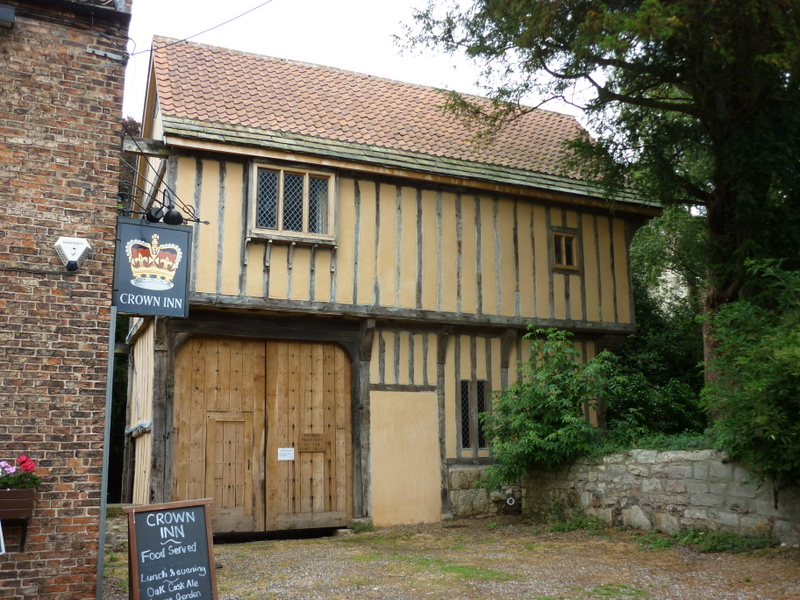
The gatehouse, in 2011

Bolton Percy Gatehouse is a historic building in the village of Bolton Percy, southwest of York in England.

The gatehouse was built in the late 15th century, as the entrance to a courtyard of buildings including the village rectory. In the late 17th century, the main house was replaced by the current Old Rectory following which, the lower floor of the building was used as stables and as a cowhouse, while the upper floor was used as a granary. In 1799, the Crown Inn was built next to the gatehouse, at which time the western part of the building may have been reduced to one storey. The other buildings around the courtyard were demolished in the 19th century, and the gatehouse declined in importance. By 1938, the passageway through the gatehouse had been boarded up, and the building was disused for many years. It was considered for removal to the Avoncroft Museum of Historic Buildings, but was instead donated to the Bolton Percy Gatehouse Trust and restored on site, from 1972 to 1974. The western part of the building was not included in the restoration, and had partially collapsed by the 1990s.

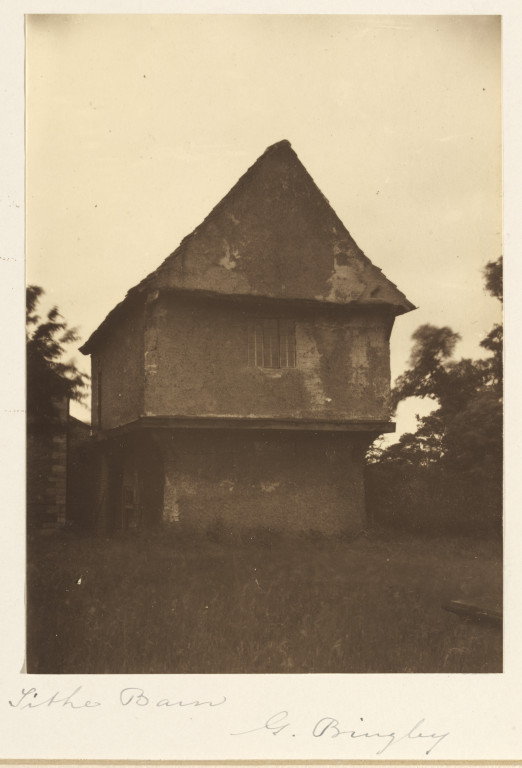
The building in 1896, at which time it was inaccurately known as the "Old Tithe Barn"

The building was later purchased by the Vivat Trust, which in 2010 converted it into a two-bedroom house, to be used as a holiday let. The trust went bankrupt in 2016, and the property was sold, but continued in use as a holiday home.

The building is entirely timber framed, and is built of oak, with infill, over a plinth of Magnesian Limestone. It is two storeys high and three bays wide, one containing the carriage arch. The first floor is jettied. Inside, there are various carvings in the roof braces, including a Tudor rose. The windows are modern. The building has been Grade II* listed since 1980.

== See also ==
- Grade II* listed buildings in North Yorkshire (district)
- Listed buildings in Bolton Percy
