= Herbert Grotrian =

Coat of arms of Herbert Grotrian
Crest A wyvern Or resting the dexter leg upon a rose Argent barbed and seeded Proper. Escutcheon Gules a wyvern Or in chief two roses Argent barbed and seeded Proper. Motto Animo Et Fide

Sir Herbert Brent Grotrian, 1st Baronet, KC DL (1870 – 28 October 1951) was an English Member of Parliament from 1924 to 1929 who was created a baronet in 1934.

Educated at Rossall School and Trinity College, Oxford, Grotrian was the second son of Frederick Brent Grotrian of Ingmanthorpe Hall, Wetherby, and of West Hill House, Hessle, near Hull, Conservative Member of Parliament for Kingston upon Hull East from 1886 to 1892, and himself represented Kingston upon Hull South West in the House of Commons as a Conservative, 1924–1929.

He was appointed a King's Counsel in 1925, was High Sheriff of Bedfordshire, 1931–32, and was a member of the United University Club. Grotrian was created a baronet 'of Leighton Buzzard in the County of Bedford' on 28 June 1934.

In retirement, he lived in the Bahamas.

Grotrian was succeeded in the title by his only surviving son, Sir Joseph Appelbe Brent Grotrian, 2nd Baronet (1904–1984). His other two sons were killed on active service.

Parliament of the United Kingdom
Preceded by Cyril Entwistle	Member of Parliament for Kingston upon Hull South West; 1924–1929	Succeeded by John Arnott
Baronetage of the United Kingdom
New creation	Baronet (of Leighton Buzzard); 1934–1951	Succeeded by Joseph Grotrian
