= John Bilson (architect) =

English architect

- Born: 1856; Newark-on-Trent, Nottinghamshire, England
- Died: 1943
- Occupation: Architect
- Known for: Medieval architectural research

John Bilson (1856–1943) was an English architect trained under William Botterill, later working as a partner in Botterill and Bilson. Bilson is best known for his architectural research on the medieval period.

== Biography ==
John Bilson was born on 23 September 1856 in Newark-on-Trent, Nottinghamshire and educated at Wesley College, Sheffield. He trained in architecture under William Botterill from 1873 to 1877, and joined the practice as a partner in 1881.

After Botterill's son's early death in 1879 Bilson became the main partner in the practice, and took over the business completely when Botterill retired in 1899.

Bilson received a D.Litt. from Durham University in 1925 for his work on dating the architecture of Durham Cathedral. he was also honoured by the Société française d'archéologie (French) in 1926.

John had two children, John Seymour Craven Bilson (born 1903) and Joan Bilson (born 1906).

He died 15 December 1943.

=== Legacy ===
Bilson is well regarded for his historical work on medieval architecture; on his work at Durham it has been written "The chronology of the works [..] of construction have been established by John Bilson on such solid bases that there is nothing significant to be added." John Bilson also wrote an article for the 1911 Encyclopædia Britannica on Romanesque and Gothic Architecture in England. Photographs attributed to Bilson are held by The Courtauld in the Conway Library of art and architecture, and are currently being digitised.
