= Sydney Smith (British politician) =

British politician (1885–1984)

Sydney Herbert Smith (27 April 1885 – 12 June 1984) was a Labour Party politician in England. He was elected as member of parliament (MP) for Kingston upon Hull South West in the Labour landslide at the 1945 general election, and held the seat until the constituency was abolished for the 1950 general election. He did not stand again.

== Life ==
Sydney Smith came from a family of tailors that moved from Birmingham, to Ipswich, and finally to London where he was born in 1885. There was always some politics in his life, though not initially of the left. His maternal grandfather, Charles Hedges, had been political agent to Benjamin Disraeli. The family moved to Goole when Sydney was nine where his paternal uncle lived. His cousin was a Goole newsagent and Sydney became one of his newspaper sellers.

By the age of 18 Sydney had moved to Hull and set up his own newsagent business. He had been born into Methodism and in that regard became a lay preacher. Politically he was a socialist and joined the Independent Labour Party during the Edwardian years. He was in Russia at the time of the Bolshevik Revolution of 1917 which had a lasting effect on his political beliefs. Eventually he attended Ruskin College in Oxford, long associated with the labour movement, and then St Catherine's Society, where he read modern history. His business expanded into books especially of Fabian Society literature, from which he developed a wider interest in politics.

He was elected to Hull City Council in 1923 and remained almost continually on the council until 1942, served as Lord Mayor in 1940. A lifelong bachelor, his niece acted as his lady mayoress, although it is known that he did propose to Kathleen Parker whom he subsequently sponsored through St Hilda's College, Oxford. In the landslide Labour victory at the 1945 General Election he was elected for the Hull South West seat, but stood down after only five years, and returned to municipal politics. He was made an Honorary Alderman of Hull for life in 1970; a Hull school was named after him; the university awarded him an honorary Doctor of Laws; and he became an Honorary Freeman of the City and Life Member of the University Court. Alderman Smith died on 12 June 1984 at age 99.

In the early 1970s he made a bequest to Hull University to inaugurate the new Department of Economic and Social History with a four-year lecture series in labour and social history. The endowment became perpetual through a trust and so emerged the Alderman Sydney Smith Lecture. He was in his mid 80s by this time and while he attended the first lecture he was blind and nearly deaf. In subsequent years, details of the lecture were related to him orally and tape recordings of the lecture were made, many of which are available in the University Library. The lecture went into abeyance in 1988 and was not brought back into university life again until 2010 when it became associated with the work of WISE.

Parliament of the United Kingdom
Preceded by Richard Law	Member of Parliament for Kingston upon Hull South West; 1945–1950	Constituency abolished
