= Kingston upon Hull South West =

Parliamentary constituency in the United Kingdom, 1918–1950

- Former borough constituency for the House of Commons

1918–1950
- Seats: one
- Created from: Hull West
- Replaced by: Hull Central

Kingston upon Hull South West was a borough constituency in the city of Kingston upon Hull in East Yorkshire. It returned one Member of Parliament (MP) to the House of Commons of the Parliament of the United Kingdom, elected by the first past the post voting system.

The constituency was created for the 1918 general election, and abolished for the 1950 general election.

== Boundaries ==
The County Borough of Kingston-upon-Hull wards of Coltman, North Newington, and South Newington.

== Members of Parliament ==
Year	Member	Party
1918	Cyril Entwistle	Liberal
1924	Sir Herbert Brent Grotrian	Conservative
1929	John Arnott	Labour
1931	Richard Law	Conservative
1945	Sydney Smith	Labour
1950	constituency abolished	

== Election results ==
=== Election in the 1910s ===
Entwistle

General election 1918: Hull South West
Party		Candidate	Votes	%	±%
	Liberal	Cyril Entwistle	6,724	41.52	
C	Coalition Labour	John R. Bell	5,005	30.90	
	Labour	Robert Mell	3,121	19.27	
	NFDDSS	Albert Edward Shakesby	695	4.29	
	Independent Business	Percy Selwyn Newbond	650	4.01	
Majority			1,719	10.62	
Turnout			16,195	49.68	
Registered electors			32,601		
	Liberal win (new seat)				
C indicates candidate endorsed by the coalition government.

Bell was also endorsed by the National Sailors and Firemans Union

=== Elections in the 1920s ===
General election 1922: Hull South West
Party	Candidate	Votes	%	±%
Liberal	Cyril Entwistle	10,360	40.61	−0.91
Unionist	Herbert Brent Grotrian	9,597	37.62	N/A
Labour	John Arnott	4,859	19.05	−0.22
National Liberal	David Pughe	692	2.71	N/A
Majority		763	2.99	N/A
Turnout		25,508	72.50	+22.82
Registered electors		35,182		
Liberal hold		Swing		

General election 1923: Hull South West
Party	Candidate	Votes	%	±%
Liberal	Cyril Entwistle	10,316	40.98	+0.37
Unionist	Herbert Brent Grotrian	8,883	35.29	−2.33
Labour	John Arnott	5,973	23.83	+4.78
Majority		1,433	5.69	+2.70
Turnout		25,172	70.25	−2.25
Registered electors		35,832		
Liberal hold		Swing	+1.35	

General election 1924: Hull South West
Party	Candidate	Votes	%	±%
Unionist	Herbert Brent Grotrian	11,190	40.97	+5.68
Liberal	Cyril Entwistle	8,155	29.86	−11.12
Labour	John Arnott	7,965	29.17	+5.34
Majority		3,035	11.11	N/A
Turnout		27,310	75.36	+5.11
Registered electors		36,240		
Unionist gain from Liberal		Swing	+8.40	

General election 1929: Hull South West
Party	Candidate	Votes	%	±%
Labour	John Arnott	14,903	41.18	+12.01
Unionist	Herbert Brent Grotrian	12,464	34.44	−6.53
Liberal	Herbert Aubrey Crowe	8,826	24.39	−5.47
Majority		2,439	6.74	N/A
Turnout		36,193	76.65	+1.29
Registered electors		47,219		
Labour gain from Unionist		Swing	+9.27	

=== Elections in the 1930s ===
General election 1931: Hull South West
Party	Candidate	Votes	%	±%
Conservative	Richard Law	25,909	66.83	+32.39
Labour	John Arnott	12,857	33.17	−8.01
Majority		13,052	33.66	N/A
Turnout		38,766	78.60	+1.95
Registered electors		49,322		
Conservative gain from Labour		Swing	+20.20	

General election 14 November 1935: Hull South West
Party	Candidate	Votes	%	±%
Conservative	Richard Law	17,406	51.00	−15.83
Labour	John Arnott	13,975	40.95	+7.78
Liberal	Francis Vernon Baxter	2,749	8.05	New
Majority		3,431	10.05	−23.61
Turnout		34,130	68.77	−9.83
Registered electors		49,632		
Conservative hold		Swing	−11.81	

=== Election in the 1940s ===
General Election 1939–40: A general election was due to take place by the spring of 1940. By the autumn of 1939, the following candidates had been adopted to contest that election. Due to the outbreak of war, the election never took place.

- Conservative: Richard Law
- Labour Party: Sydney Smith (Dennis Gordon was PPC until 1939 when he was expelled)

General election 1945: Hull South West
Party	Candidate	Votes	%	±%
Labour	Sydney Smith	18,606	58.98	+18.03
Conservative	Richard Law	10,294	32.63	−18.37
Liberal	Ernest Edgar Dalton	2,645	8.38	+0.33
Majority		8,312	26.35	N/A
Turnout		31,545	74.54	+5.77
Registered electors		42,320		
Labour gain from Conservative		Swing	+18.20	
